= LIBSVM =

Machine learning programming library

- Developers: Chih-Chung Chang and Chih-Jen Lin
- Stable release: 3.3 / August 11, 2022; 4 years ago
- Written in: Java, C++
- Operating system: Cross-platform
- Type: Machine Learning
- License: BSD
- Website: www.csie.ntu.edu.tw/~cjlin/libsvm
- Repository: github.com/cjlin1/libsvm

LIBSVM and LIBLINEAR are two popular open source machine learning libraries, both developed at the National Taiwan University and both written in C++ though with a C API. LIBSVM implements the sequential minimal optimization (SMO) algorithm for kernelized support vector machines (SVMs), supporting classification and regression. LIBLINEAR implements linear SVMs and logistic regression models trained using a coordinate descent algorithm.

The SVM learning code from both libraries is often reused in other open source machine learning toolkits, including GATE, KNIME, Orange and scikit-learn. Bindings and ports exist for programming languages such as Java, MATLAB, R, Julia, and Python. It is available in e1071 library in R and scikit-learn in Python.

Both libraries are free software released under the 3-clause BSD license.

== See also ==
- Comparison of machine learning software
