= Decision boundary =

Hypersurface used by a classification algorithm

In a statistical-classification problem with two classes, a decision boundary or decision surface is a hypersurface that partitions the underlying vector space into two sets, one for each class. The classifier will classify all the points on one side of the decision boundary as belonging to one class and all those on the other side as belonging to the other class.

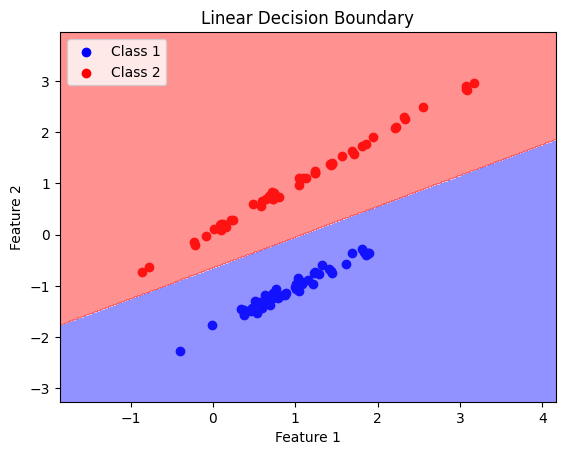
Illustration of a decision boundary in a classification problem

A decision boundary is the region of a problem space in which the output label of a classifier is ambiguous.

If the decision surface is a hyperplane, then the classification problem is linear, and the classes are linearly separable.

Decision boundaries are not always clear cut. That is, the transition from one class in the feature space to another is not discontinuous, but gradual. This effect is common in fuzzy logic based classification algorithms, where membership in one class or another is ambiguous.

Decision boundaries can be approximations of optimal stopping boundaries. The decision boundary is the set of points of that hyperplane that pass through zero. For example, the angle between a vector and points in a set must be zero for points that are on or close to the decision boundary.

Decision boundary instability can be incorporated with generalization error as a standard for selecting the most accurate and stable classifier.

== In neural networks and support vector models ==
In the case of backpropagation based artificial neural networks or perceptrons, the type of decision boundary that the network can learn is determined by the number of hidden layers the network has. If it has no hidden layers, then it can only learn linear problems. If it has one hidden layer, then it can learn any continuous function on compact subsets of R^{n} as shown by the universal approximation theorem, thus it can have an arbitrary decision boundary.

In particular, support vector machines find a hyperplane that separates the feature space into two classes with the maximum margin. If the problem is not originally linearly separable, the kernel trick can be used to turn it into a linearly separable one, by increasing the number of dimensions. Thus a general hypersurface in a small dimension space is turned into a hyperplane in a space with much larger dimensions.

Neural networks try to learn the decision boundary which minimizes the empirical error, while support vector machines try to learn the decision boundary which maximizes the empirical margin between the decision boundary and data points.

== See also ==
- Discriminant function
- Hyperplane separation theorem
