= James Mercer (mathematician) =

James Mercer FRS (15 January 1883 – 21 February 1932) was a mathematician, born in Bootle, close to Liverpool, England.

He was educated at University of Manchester, and then University of Cambridge. He became a Fellow, saw active service at the Battle of Jutland in World War I and, after decades of ill health, died in London.

He proved Mercer's theorem, which states that positive-definite kernels can be expressed as a dot product in a high-dimensional space. This theorem is the basis of the kernel trick (applied by Aizerman), which allows linear algorithms to be easily converted into non-linear algorithms.
