= Shogun (toolbox) =

Machine learning software library in C++

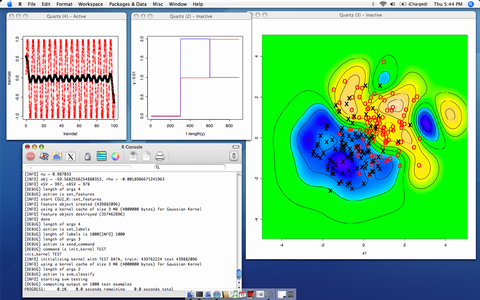
Shogun machine learning toolbox Shogun mac os
- Original authors: Gunnar Rätsch; Soeren Sonnenburg
- Developers: Soeren Sonnenburg; Sergey Lisitsyn; Heiko Strathmann; Fernando Iglesias; Viktor Gal
- Stable release: 6.1.4 / July 5, 2019
- Written in: C++
- Operating system: Cross-platform
- Type: Software library
- License: BSD3 with optional GNU GPLv3
- Website: www.shogun-toolbox.org
- Repository: github.com/shogun-toolbox/shogun

Shogun is a free, open-source machine learning software library written in C++. It offers numerous algorithms and data structures for machine learning problems. It offers interfaces for Octave, Python, R, Java, Lua, Ruby and C# using SWIG.

It is licensed under the terms of the GNU General Public License version 3 or later.

== Description ==
The focus of Shogun is on kernel machines such as support vector machines for regression and classification problems. Shogun also offers a full implementation of Hidden Markov models. The core of Shogun is written in C++ and offers interfaces for MATLAB, Octave, Python, R, Java, Lua, Ruby and C#. Shogun has been under active development since 1999. Today there is a rich user community across the world using Shogun as a base for research and education, and contributing to the core package.

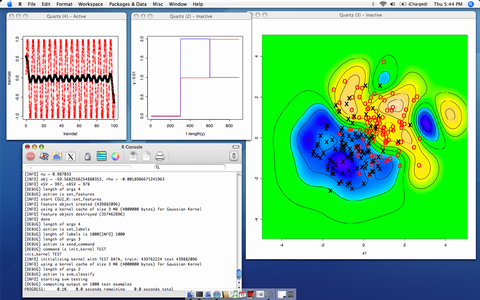
A screenshot taken under Mac OS X

== Supported algorithms ==
Currently Shogun supports the following algorithms:

- Support vector machines
- Dimensionality reduction algorithms, such as PCA, Kernel PCA, Locally Linear Embedding, Hessian Locally Linear Embedding, Local Tangent Space Alignment, Linear Local Tangent Space Alignment, Kernel Locally Linear Embedding, Kernel Local Tangent Space Alignment, Multidimensional Scaling, Isomap, Diffusion Maps, Laplacian Eigenmaps
- Online learning algorithms such as SGD-QN, Vowpal Wabbit
- Clustering algorithms: k-means and GMM
- Kernel Ridge Regression, Support Vector Regression
- Hidden Markov Models
- K-Nearest Neighbors
- Linear discriminant analysis
- Kernel Perceptrons.

Many different kernels are implemented, ranging from kernels for numerical data (such as gaussian or linear kernels) to kernels on special data (such as strings over certain alphabets). The currently implemented kernels for numeric data include:

- linear
- gaussian
- polynomial
- sigmoid kernels

The supported kernels for special data include:

- Spectrum
- Weighted Degree
- Weighted Degree with Shifts

The latter group of kernels allows processing of arbitrary sequences over fixed alphabets such as DNA sequences as well as whole e-mail texts.

== Special features ==
As Shogun was developed with bioinformatics applications in mind it is capable of processing huge datasets consisting of up to 10 million samples. Shogun supports the use of pre-calculated kernels. It is also possible to use a combined kernel i.e. a kernel consisting of a linear combination of arbitrary kernels over different domains. The coefficients or weights of the linear combination can be learned as well. For this purpose Shogun offers a multiple kernel learning functionality.

== See also ==
- Comparison of machine learning software
