= Spectral layout =

Graph drawing using eigenvector coordinates

Spectral layout drawing of random small-world network.

For comparison, the same graph plotted as spring graph drawing.

Spectral layout is a class of algorithm for drawing graphs. The layout uses the eigenvectors of a matrix, such as the Laplace matrix of the graph, as Cartesian coordinates of the graph's vertices.

The idea of the layout is to compute the two largest (or smallest) eigenvalues and corresponding eigenvectors of the Laplacian matrix of the graph and then use those for actually placing the nodes. Usually nodes are placed in the 2 dimensional plane. An embedding into more dimensions can be found by using more eigenvectors. In the 2-dimensional case, for a given node which corresponds to the row/column $i$ in the (symmetric) Laplacian matrix $L$ of the graph, the $x$ and $y$-coordinates are the $i$-th entries of the first and second eigenvectors of $L$, respectively.
