= Mercer's theorem =

Mathematical theorem

In mathematics, specifically functional analysis, Mercer's theorem is a representation of a symmetric positive-definite function on a square as a sum of a convergent sequence of product functions. This theorem, presented in (Mercer 1909), is one of the most notable results of the work of James Mercer (1883–1932). It is an important theoretical tool in the theory of integral equations; it is used in the Hilbert space theory of stochastic processes, for example the Karhunen–Loève theorem; and it is also used in the reproducing kernel Hilbert space theory where it characterizes a symmetric positive-definite kernel as a reproducing kernel.

== Introduction ==
To explain Mercer's theorem, we first consider an important special case; see below for a more general formulation. A kernel, in this context, is a symmetric continuous function

$$K: [a,b] \times [a,b] \rightarrow \mathbb{R}$$

where $K(x,y) = K(y,x)$ for all $x,y \in [a,b]$.

K is said to be a positive-definite kernel if and only if

$$\sum_{i=1}^n\sum_{j=1}^n K(x_i, x_j) c_i c_j \geq 0$$

for all finite sequences of points x_{1}, ..., x_{n} of [a, b] and all choices of real numbers c_{1}, ..., c_{n}. Note that the term "positive-definite" is well-established in literature despite the weak inequality in the definition.

The fundamental characterization of stationary positive-definite kernels (where $K(x,y) = K(x-y)$) is given by Bochner's theorem. It states that a continuous function $K(x-y)$ is positive-definite if and only if it can be expressed as the Fourier transform of a finite non-negative measure $\mu$:

$$K(x-y) = \int_{-\infty}^{\infty} e^{i(x-y)\omega} \, d\mu(\omega)$$

This spectral representation reveals the connection between positive definiteness and harmonic analysis, providing a stronger and more direct characterization of positive definiteness than the abstract definition in terms of inequalities when the kernel is stationary, e.g., when it can be expressed as a 1-variable function of the distance between points rather than the 2-variable function of the positions of pairs of points.

Associated to K is a linear operator (more specifically a Hilbert–Schmidt integral operator when the interval is compact) on functions defined by the integral

$$[T_K \varphi](x) =\int_a^b  K(x,s) \varphi(s)\, ds.$$

We assume $\varphi$ can range through the space of real-valued square-integrable functions L^{2}[a, b]; however, in many cases the associated reproducing kernel Hilbert space can be strictly larger than L^{2}[a, b]. Since T_{K} is a linear operator, the eigenvalues and eigenfunctions of T_{K} exist.

Theorem. Suppose K is a continuous symmetric positive-definite kernel. Then there is an orthonormal basis {e_{i}}_{i} of L^{2}[a, b] consisting of eigenfunctions of T_{K} such that the corresponding sequence of eigenvalues {λ_{i}}_{i} is nonnegative. The eigenfunctions corresponding to non-zero eigenvalues are continuous on [a, b] and K has the representation

$$K(s,t) = \sum_{j=1}^\infty \lambda_j \, e_j(s) \, e_j(t)$$

where the convergence is absolute and uniform.

== Details ==
We now explain in greater detail the structure of the proof of Mercer's theorem, particularly how it relates to spectral theory of compact operators.

- The map K ↦ T_{K} is injective.
- T_{K} is a non-negative symmetric compact operator on L^{2}[a,b]; moreover K(x, x) ≥ 0.

To show compactness, show that the image of the unit ball of L^{2}[a,b] under T_{K} is equicontinuous and apply Ascoli's theorem, to show that the image of the unit ball is relatively compact in C([a,b]) with the uniform norm and a fortiori in L^{2}[a,b].

Now apply the spectral theorem for compact operators on Hilbert spaces to T_{K} to show the existence of the orthonormal basis {e_{i}}_{i} of L^{2}[a,b]

$$\lambda_i e_i(t)= [T_K e_i](t)  = \int_a^b K(t,s) e_i(s)\, ds.$$

If λ_{i} ≠ 0, the eigenvector (eigenfunction) e_{i} is seen to be continuous on [a,b]. Now

$$\sum_{i=1}^\infty \lambda_i |e_i(t) e_i(s)| \leq \sup_{x \in [a,b]} |K(x,x)|,$$

which shows that the sequence

$$\sum_{i=1}^\infty \lambda_i e_i(t) e_i(s)$$

converges absolutely and uniformly to a kernel K_{0} which is easily seen to define the same operator as the kernel K. Hence K=K_{0} from which Mercer's theorem follows.

Finally, to show non-negativity of the eigenvalues one can write $\lambda \langle f,f \rangle= \langle f, T_{K}f \rangle$ and expressing the right hand side as an integral well-approximated by its Riemann sums, which are non-negative by positive-definiteness of K, implying $\lambda \langle f,f \rangle \geq 0$, implying $\lambda \geq 0$.

== Trace ==
The following is immediate:

Theorem. Suppose K is a continuous symmetric positive-definite kernel; T_{K} has a sequence of nonnegative eigenvalues {λ_{i}}_{i}. Then

$$\int_a^b K(t,t)\, dt = \sum_i \lambda_i.$$

This shows that the operator T_{K} is a trace class operator and

$$\operatorname{trace}(T_K) = \int_a^b K(t,t)\, dt.$$

== Generalizations ==
Mercer's theorem itself is a generalization of the result that any symmetric positive-semidefinite matrix is the Gramian matrix of a set of vectors.

The first generalization replaces the interval [a, b] with any compact Hausdorff space and Lebesgue measure on [a, b] is replaced by a finite countably additive measure μ on the Borel algebra of X whose support is X. This means that μ(U) > 0 for any nonempty open subset U of X.

A recent generalization replaces these conditions by the following: the set X is a first-countable topological space endowed with a Borel (complete) measure μ. X is the support of μ and, for all x in X, there is an open set U containing x and having finite measure. Then essentially the same result holds:

Theorem. Suppose K is a continuous symmetric positive-definite kernel on X. If the function κ is L^{1}_{μ}(X), where κ(x) := K(x,x) for all x in X, then there is an orthonormal set {e_{i}}_{i} of L^{2}_{μ}(X) consisting of eigenfunctions of T_{K} such that corresponding sequence of eigenvalues {λ_{i}}_{i} is nonnegative. The eigenfunctions corresponding to non-zero eigenvalues are continuous on X and K has the representation

$$K(s,t) = \sum_{j=1}^\infty \lambda_j \, e_j(s) \, e_j(t)$$

where the convergence is absolute and uniform on compact subsets of X.

The next generalization deals with representations of measurable kernels.

Let (X, M, μ) be a σ-finite measure space. An L^{2} (or square-integrable) kernel on X is a function

$$K \in L^2_{\mu \otimes \mu}(X \times X).$$

L^{2} kernels define a bounded operator T_{K} by the formula

$$\langle T_K \varphi, \psi \rangle = \int_{X \times X} K(y,x) \varphi(y) \psi(x) \,d[\mu \otimes \mu](y,x).$$

T_{K} is a compact operator (actually it is even a Hilbert–Schmidt operator). If the kernel K is symmetric, by the spectral theorem, T_{K} has an orthonormal basis of eigenvectors. Those eigenvectors that correspond to non-zero eigenvalues can be arranged in a sequence {e_{i}}_{i} (regardless of separability).

Theorem. If K is a symmetric positive-definite kernel on (X, M, μ), then

$$K(y,x) = \sum_{i \in \mathbb{N}} \lambda_i e_i(y) e_i(x)$$

where the convergence in the L^{2} norm. Note that when continuity of the kernel is not assumed, the expansion no longer converges uniformly.

== Mercer's condition ==
A real-valued function K(x,y) is said to fulfill Mercer's condition if for all square-integrable functions g(x) one has

$$\iint g(x)K(x,y)g(y)\,dx\,dy \geq 0.$$

=== Discrete analog ===
This is analogous to the definition of a positive-semidefinite matrix. This is a matrix $K$ of dimension $N$, which satisfies, for all vectors $g$, the property

$$(g,Kg)=g^{T}{\cdot}Kg=\sum_{i=1}^N\sum_{j=1}^N\,g_i\,K_{ij}\,g_j\geq0$$.

=== Examples ===
A positive constant function

$$K(x, y)=c\,$$

satisfies Mercer's condition, as then the integral becomes by Fubini's theorem

$$\iint g(x)\,c\,g(y)\,dx \, dy = c\int\! g(x) \,dx \int\! g(y) \,dy = c\left(\int\! g(x) \,dx\right)^2$$

which is indeed non-negative.

== See also ==
- Kernel trick
- Representer theorem
- Reproducing kernel Hilbert space
- Spectral theory
