= Degree matrix =

Type of matrix in algebraic graph theory

In the mathematical field of algebraic graph theory, the degree matrix of an undirected graph is a diagonal matrix which contains information about the degree of each vertex—that is, the number of edges attached to each vertex. It is used together with the adjacency matrix to construct the Laplacian matrix of a graph: the Laplacian matrix is the difference of the degree matrix and the adjacency matrix.

== Definition ==
Given a graph $G=(V,E)$ with $|V|=n$, the degree matrix $D$ for $G$ is a $n \times n$ diagonal matrix defined as

$$D_{i,j}:=\left\{
\begin{matrix}
\deg(v_i) & \mbox{if}\ i = j \\
0 & \mbox{otherwise}
\end{matrix}
\right.$$

where the degree $\deg(v_i)$ of a vertex counts the number of times an edge terminates at that vertex. In an undirected graph, this means that each loop increases the degree of a vertex by two. In a directed graph, the term degree may refer either to indegree (the number of incoming edges at each vertex) or outdegree (the number of outgoing edges at each vertex).

== Example ==
The following undirected graph has a 6x6 degree matrix with values:

Vertex labeled graph	Degree matrix
	$$\begin{pmatrix} 4 & 0 & 0 & 0 & 0 & 0\\ 0 & 3 & 0 & 0 & 0 & 0\\ 0 & 0 & 2 & 0 & 0 & 0\\ 0 & 0 & 0 & 3 & 0 & 0\\ 0 & 0 & 0 & 0 & 3 & 0\\ 0 & 0 & 0 & 0 & 0 & 1\\ \end{pmatrix}$$

Note that in the case of undirected graphs, an edge that starts and ends in the same node increases the corresponding degree value by 2 (i.e. it is counted twice).

== Properties ==
The degree matrix of a k-regular graph has a constant diagonal of $k$.

According to the degree sum formula, the trace of the degree matrix is twice the number of edges of the considered graph.
