= Multiclass =

Multiclass may refer to:

- Multiclass classification, in machine learning
- Having multiple character classes in a role-playing game
  - Character class (Dungeons & Dragons) § Multiclassing
