= Classifier chains =

Classifier chains is a machine learning method for problem transformation in multi-label classification. It combines the computational efficiency of the binary relevance method while still being able to take the label dependencies into account for classification.

== Problem transformation ==
Several problem transformation methods exist. One of them is the Binary Relevance method (BR). Given a set of labels $\mathit{L}\,$ and a data set with instances of the form $\mathit{(x, Y)}\,$ where $\mathit{x}\,$ is a feature vector and $Y \subseteq L$ is a set of labels assigned to the instance. BR transforms the data set into $\left \vert L \right \vert$ data sets and learns $\left \vert L \right \vert$ binary classifiers $H: X \rightarrow \{l, \neg l\}$ for each label $l \in L$. During this process the information about dependencies between labels is not preserved. This can lead to a situation where a set of labels is assigned to an instance although these labels never co-occur together in the data set. Thus, information about label co-occurrence can help to assign correct label combinations. Loss of this information can in some cases lead to a decrease in classification performance.

Another approach, which takes into account label correlations, is the Label Powerset method (LP). Each combination of labels in a data set is considered to be a single label. After transformation a single-label classifier $H: X \rightarrow \mathcal{P}(L)$ is trained where $\mathcal{P}(L)$ is the power set of all labels in $\mathit{L}$. The main drawback of this approach is that the number of label combinations grows exponentially with the number of labels. For example, a multi-label data set with 10 labels can have up to $2^{10} = 1024$ label combinations. This increases the run-time of classification.

The Classifier Chains method is based on the BR method and it is efficient even on a big number of labels. Furthermore, it considers dependencies between labels.

== Method description ==
For a given set of labels $\mathit{L}\,$ the Classifier Chain model (CC) learns $\left \vert L \right \vert$ classifiers as in the Binary Relevance method. All classifiers are linked in a chain through feature space.

Given a data set where the $i$-th instance has the form $\mathit{(x_{i}, Y_{i})}\,$ where $\mathit{Y_{i}}\,$ is a subset of labels, $\mathit{x_{i}}\,$ is a set of features. The data set is transformed in $\left \vert L \right \vert$ data sets where instances of the $j$-th data set has the form $((x_{i}, l_{1}, ..., l_{j-1}), l_{j}), l_{j} \in \{0,1\}$. If the $j$-th label was assigned to the instance then $\mathit{l_{j}}\,$ is $1$, otherwise it is $0$. Thus, classifiers build a chain where each of them learns binary classification of a single label. The features given to each classifier are extended with binary values that indicate which of previous labels were assigned to the instance.

By classifying new instances the labels are again predicted by building a chain of classifiers. The classification begins with the first classifier $\mathit{C_{1}}\,$ and proceeds to the last one $\mathit{C_{|L|}}\,$ by passing label information between classifiers through the feature space. Hence, the inter-label dependency is preserved. However, the result can vary for different order of chains. For example, if a label often co-occur with some other label, then only instances of the label which comes later in the chain will have information about the other one in its feature vector. In order to solve this problem and increase accuracy it is possible to use ensemble of classifiers.

In Ensemble of Classifier Chains (ECC) several CC classifiers can be trained with random order of chains (i.e. random order of labels) on a random subset of data set. Labels of a new instance are predicted by each classifier separately. After that, the total number of predictions or "votes" is counted for each label. The label is accepted if it was predicted by a percentage of classifiers that is bigger than some threshold value.

== Adaptations ==
There is also regressor chains, which themselves can resemble vector autoregression models if the order of the chain makes sure temporal order is respected.

== See also ==
- Multi-label classification
- Binary relevance
- Ensemble learning
- Binary classification
- Vector autoregression
