= Platt scaling =

Machine learning calibration technique

In machine learning, Platt scaling or Platt calibration is a way of transforming the outputs of a classification model into a probability distribution over classes. The method was invented by John Platt in the context of support vector machines, replacing an earlier method by Vapnik, but can be applied to other classification models. Platt scaling works by fitting a logistic regression model to a classifier's scores.

== Problem formalization ==
Consider the problem of binary classification: for inputs x, we want to determine whether they belong to one of two classes, arbitrarily labeled +1 and −1. We assume that the classification problem will be solved by a real-valued function f, by predicting a class label y = sign(f(x)). (Note: See sign function. The label for f(x) = 0 is arbitrarily chosen to be either zero, or one.) For many problems, it is convenient to get a probability $P(y=1|x)$, i.e. a classification that not only gives an answer, but also a degree of certainty about the answer. Some classification models do not provide such a probability, or give poor probability estimates.

Standard logistic function where $L=1, k=1, x_0=0$

== Algorithm ==
Platt scaling is an algorithm to solve the aforementioned problem. It produces probability estimates

$$\mathrm{P}(y=1 | x) = \frac{1}{1 + \exp(Af(x) + B)}$$

i.e., a logistic transformation of the classifier output f(x), where A and B are two scalar parameters that are learned by the algorithm. After scaling, values can be predicted as $y=1 \text{ iff } P(y=1|x) > \frac{1}{2}$. If $B \ne 0,$ then the probability estimates are modified from to the original decision function y = sign(f(x)).

The parameters A and B are estimated using a maximum likelihood method that optimizes on the same training set as that for the original classifier f. To avoid overfitting to this set, a held-out calibration set or cross-validation can be used, but Platt additionally suggests transforming the labels y to target probabilities

$t_{+} = \frac{N_{+} + 1}{N_{+} + 2}$ for positive samples (y = 1), and
$t_{-} = \frac{1}{N_{-} + 2}$ for negative samples, y = -1.

Here, N_{+} and N_{−} are the number of positive and negative samples, respectively. This transformation follows by applying Bayes' rule to a model of out-of-sample data that has a uniform prior over the labels. The constants 1 and 2, on the numerator and denominator respectively, are derived from the application of Laplace smoothing.

Platt himself suggested using the Levenberg–Marquardt algorithm to optimize the parameters, but a Newton algorithm was later proposed that should be more numerically stable.

== Analysis ==
Platt scaling has been shown to be effective for SVMs as well as other types of classification models, including boosted models and even naive Bayes classifiers, which produce distorted probability distributions. It is particularly effective for max-margin methods such as SVMs and boosted trees, which show sigmoidal distortions in their predicted probabilities, but has less of an effect with well-calibrated models such as logistic regression, multilayer perceptrons, and random forests.

An alternative approach to probability calibration is to fit an isotonic regression model to an ill-calibrated probability model. This has been shown to work better than Platt scaling, in particular when enough training data is available.

Platt scaling can also be applied to deep neural network classifiers. For image classification, such as CIFAR-100, small networks like LeNet-5 have good calibration but low accuracy, and large networks like ResNet has high accuracy but is overconfident in predictions. A 2017 paper proposed temperature scaling, which simply multiplies the output logits of a network by a constant $1/T$ before taking the softmax. During training, $T$ is set to 1. After training, $T$ is optimized on a held-out calibration set to minimize the calibration loss.

== See also ==
- Relevance vector machine: probabilistic alternative to the support vector machine
