= John Platt (computer scientist) =

American computer scientist (born 1963)

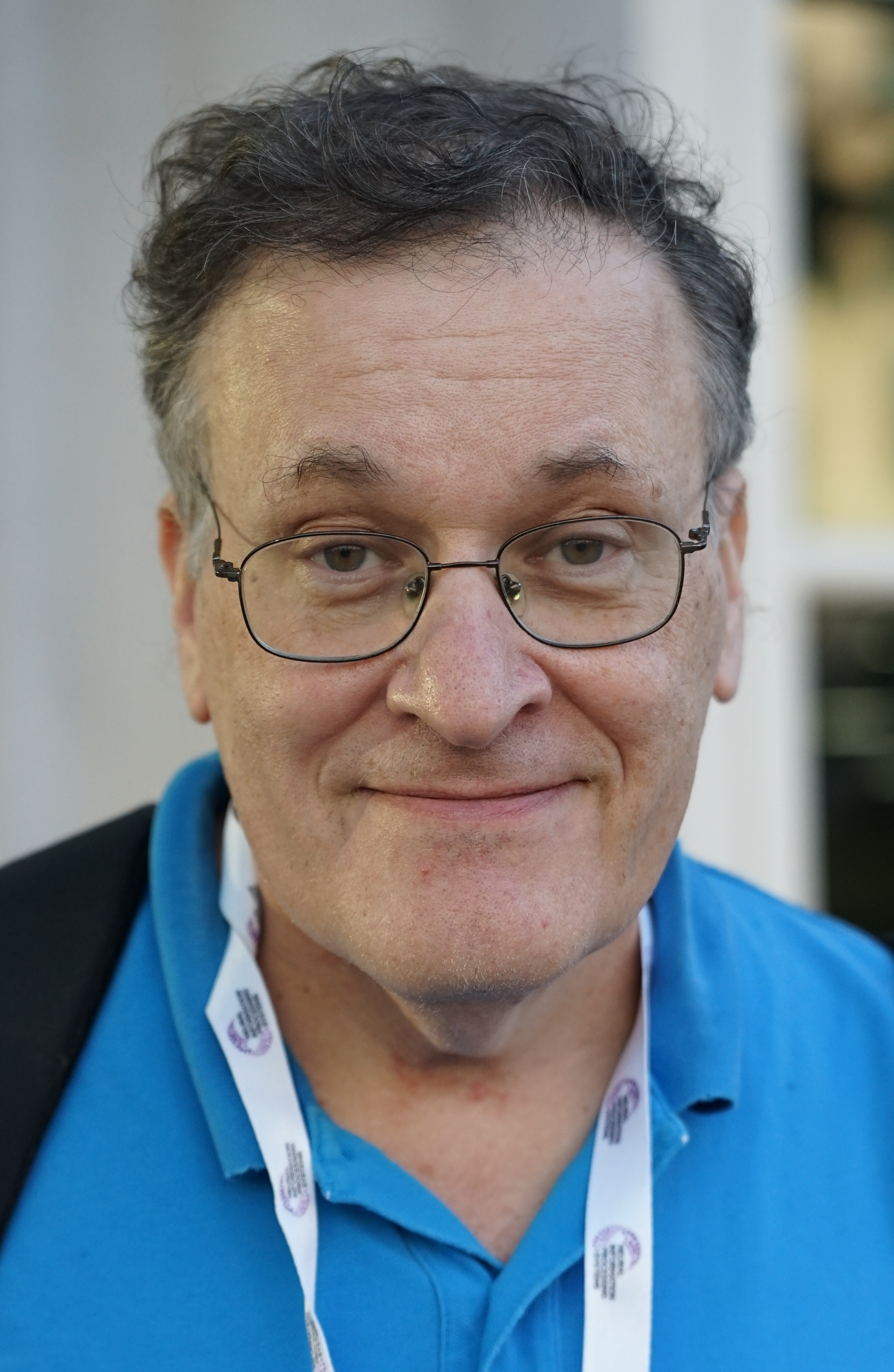
- Platt at NeurIPS 2025
- Born: 1963 (age 62–63)
- Education: California Institute of Technology
- Scientific career
- Workplaces: Google, Microsoft Research
- Thesis: Constraint methods for neural networks and computer graphics (1989)
- Doctoral advisor: Alan H. Barr; Carver Mead; John Hopfield
- Website: ai.google/research/people/JohnPlatt

John Carlton Platt (born 1963) is an American computer scientist. He is currently a Fellow at Google, where he leads the Applied Science branch of Google Research. Formerly he was a deputy managing director at Microsoft Research Redmond Labs. Platt worked for Microsoft from 1997 to 2015. Before that, he served as director of research at Synaptics.

== Life and work ==
Platt was born in Elgin, Illinois, and matriculated at California State University, Long Beach, at the age of 14. After graduating from CSULB at the age of 18, he enrolled in a computer science PhD program at California Institute of Technology.

While a student at Caltech under astronomer Gene Shoemaker, he discovered two asteroids, 3259 Brownlee and 3237 Victorplatt at Palomar Observatory on 25 September 1984. The latter he named after his father Victor Platt, while the former was named by Gene Shoemaker. Shoemaker allowed Platt to name one of his discoveries, 3927 Feliciaplatt, which he named after his mother.

In 1998, Platt invented sequential minimal optimization, a widely used algorithm for speeding up the training of support vector machines, which fixed the issue that quadratic programming brought to early machine learning techniques.

In 1999, Platt continued his work into support vector machines, creating Platt scaling, a method to turn SVMs (and other classifiers) into probability models.

In August 2005, Apple Computer had its application for a patent on the interface of the popular iPod music player rejected by the United States Patent and Trademark Office. The reason appears to be that Platt had submitted a patent application for a similar interface design five months prior to Apple's claim.

Platt shared a 2005 Scientific and Technical Achievement Oscar from the Academy of Motion Picture Arts and Sciences with Demetri Terzopoulos for their pioneering work in physically-based computer-generated techniques used to simulate realistic cloth in motion pictures.
