= Glenn W. Brier =

- Born: April 26, 1913; Woodbridge, Virginia
- Died: January 2, 1998 (aged 84)
- Education: George Washington University
- Known for: Brier score
- Scientific career
- Fields: Meteorology Weather forecasting
- Thesis: The Discriminant Function (1940)

Glenn Wilson Brier (April 26, 1913 - January 2, 1998) was an American statistician, weather forecaster and academic.

== Biography ==
=== Early life and education ===
Brier was born in Woodbridge, Virginia, on April 26, 1913, and died on January 2, 1998. He married Josephine Hartz and had three children: Richard Paul, Katherine and David.

Brier earned a Master of Arts degree in statistics from George Washington University.

=== Career ===
Brier worked for the Office of Meteorological Research of the U.S. Weather Bureau, at the U.S. Department of Commerce, from 1939 up to the 1980s.

== Legacy ==
Brier is best known for creating a scoring rule to measure the accuracy of forecasts, which is known as a Brier score. Because of his work, the score and Brier himself are widely cited by academics related not only to weather-forecasting, but by researchers in several other fields of forecasting, decision science, and various disciplines.
