= Discrimination (information) =

Act of distinguishing one thing from another

Discrimination in the original and broadest sense is the act of distinguishing one thing from another.

== Business and engineering ==
- Discrimination testing is a technique employed in sensory analysis to determine whether there is a detectable difference among two or more products.
- Markovian discrimination is a method used in spam filters to model the statistical behaviors of spam and nonspam.
- Net bias (also called data discrimination) is the differentiation of price or quality of Internet data transmission.
- Price discrimination, or price differentiation, is a pricing strategy where identical or similar goods or services are sold at different prices by the same provider to different customers.
- Selectivity (circuit breakers) (also known as circuit breaker discrimination) is the coordination of overcurrent protection devices so that a fault in the installation is cleared by the protection device located immediately upstream of the fault.
- Term discrimination is a way to rank keywords in how useful they are for information retrieval.
- Word sense discrimination is the automatic identification of the senses of a word.

== Biology and psychology ==
- A Discrimination ellipse contains a range of colors which are indistinguishable to the average human eye.
- Discrimination learning is a topic in the psychology of learning studying the process by which animals or people learn to make different responses to different stimuli.
- Host discrimination is the ability of some parasitoids to distinguish a host with parasites from an unparasitized host.
- Kin discrimination is an organism's ability to distinguish between close genetic kin and non-kin.
- Self-discrimination in plants is the ability of plants to avoid twining tendrils around themselves.
- Tactile discrimination is the ability to differentiate information received through the sense of touch.
- The texture discrimination task is a common task used in visual perception learning.
- Two-point discrimination is the ability to discern that two nearby objects touching the skin are distinct.
- Utrocular discrimination is the ability to tell which of two eyes has been stimulated by light.

== Other uses ==
- Carbon isotope discrimination is the property of certain molecules to preferentially bind specific isotopes of carbon.
- Discrimination information is a term in information theory and statistics.

== See also ==
- Discriminant (disambiguation), a term in mathematics.
