= Discriminant (disambiguation) =

The discriminant of a polynomial is a quantity that depends on the coefficients and determines various properties of the roots.

Discriminant may also refer to its various generalizations:

== Mathematics ==
- Discriminant of an algebraic number field
- Discriminant of an elliptic curve
- Discriminant of a quadratic form
- Discriminant of a real-valued function
- Fundamental discriminant
- Modular discriminant

== Medicine ==
- Modified Maddrey's discriminant function

== Psychology ==
- Discriminant validity

== Statistics ==
- Discriminant analysis
- Kernel Fisher discriminant analysis
- Multiple discriminant analysis
