= Perceptual mapping =

Map of customer perceptions

Perceptual mapping or market mapping is a diagrammatic technique used by asset marketers that attempts to visually display the perceptions of customers or potential customers. The positioning of a brand is influenced by customer perceptions rather than by those of businesses. For example, a business may feel it sells upmarket products of high quality, but if customers view the products as low quality, it is their views which will influence sales. Typically the position of a company's product, product line, or brand is displayed relative to their competition. Perceptual maps, also known as market maps, usually have two dimensions but can be multi-dimensional or use multiple colours to add an extra variable. They can be used to identify gaps in the market and potential partners or merger targets as well as to clarify perceptual problems with a company's product. So, if a business wants to find out where its brand is positioned in the market, it might carry out market research. This will help them to find out how the customers sees their brand in relation to others in the market.

== Uses ==
Perceptual mapping enables companies to better understand their customers: the who, why, where, how and what of their behaviour. If a business is perceived in a manner they find unsatisfactory, further research then identifies what can be done to change that. Perceptual mapping also allows businesses to see what consumers think of other brands, particularly their competitors. Regular uses of the maps can help track preferences, and see changes as they happen. Perceptual mapping can help define market segments, showing clusters of businesses differentiated by key aspects (such as higher class or number of restaurants). Within the clusters found in perceptual maps of entire industries, a business can classify potential partners or possible businesses to merge with, since the clustering of brands signifies the similarity in businesses, meaning they have corresponding attributes. It can also help identify gaps in a market where a new product or service could be introduced.

Perceptual maps can also be used to help keep track of how a new product, such as a recently introduced smartphone, is being viewed in a specific market. It is important to see that the way a business is marketing its product is not only successful, but successful in a manner that aligns with the business’s overarching goal for positioning.

Some companies seem to have fallen out of favor with the public, such as Quicken Loans and VW. Perceptual mapping can help elicit the extent of the damage.

== Other types of mapping ==
=== Spidergrams ===
Spidergrams are an alternative to perceptual mapping that similarly are visual marketing tools; however, spidergrams also request customers to rate attributes.

=== Multidimensional perceptual maps ===
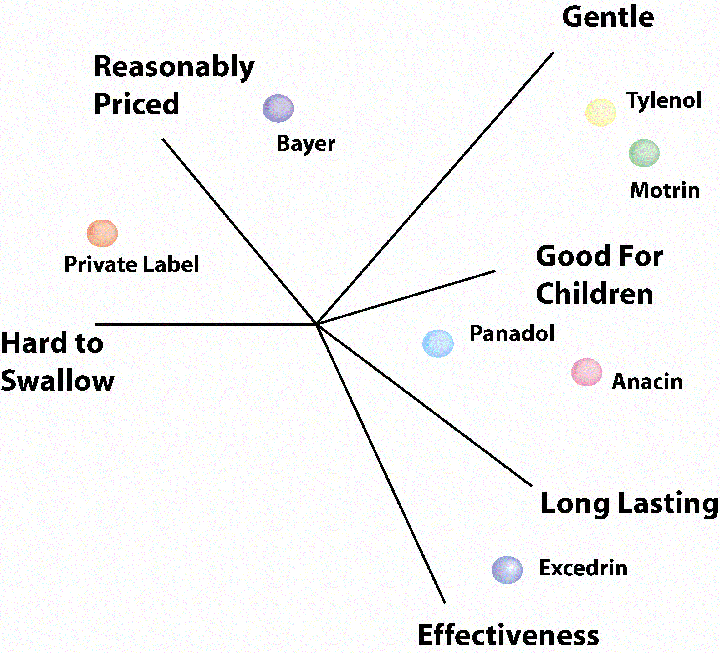
Example of a multi-dimensional perceptual map

Traditional perceptual maps are built with two visual dimensions (X- and Y-axis). Multidimensional perceptual maps are built with more dimensions visualised as profile charts in small map regions, and then items are mapped to the regions by their similarity to the vectors that represent the region. A common technique to construct this kind of multidimensional perceptual maps is the self-organizing map. This helps pinpoint more variables, allowing for more in-depth research into what influences the consumer. This means that the perceptual map can be applied beyond low-involvement purchases, and also helps with identification of segments in a market.

=== Intuitive maps ===
Perceptual maps need not come from a detailed study. There are also intuitive maps (also called judgmental maps or consensus maps) that are created by marketers based on their understanding of their industry. These are limited by not being based on consumer data.

When detailed marketing research studies are done methodological problems can arise, but at least the information is coming directly from the consumer. An assortment of statistical procedures can be used to convert the raw data collected in a survey into a perceptual map. Preference regression will produce ideal vectors. Multi dimensional scaling will produce either ideal points or competitor positions. Factor analysis, discriminant analysis, cluster analysis and logit analysis can also be used. Some techniques are constructed from perceived differences between products, others from perceived similarities, and still others from cross price elasticity of demand data from electronic scanners.

== Modern techniques ==
Marketers can reveal shoppers' collective perceptual map with increasing precision and detail by aggregating and analysing their data; this is done, for example, in the smartphone and laptop industries.

Furthermore, they can be used in non-commercial applications, such as identifying factors involved in dangerous driving.

== See also ==
- Diffusion of innovations
- Discriminant analysis
- Marketing research
- Multidimensional scaling
- Product life-cycle management (marketing)
- Product management
