= Intent scale translation =

Intent scale translation is a mathematical technique used by marketers to convert stated purchase intentions into purchase probabilities, that is, into an estimate of actual buying behaviour. It takes survey data on consumers purchase intentions, and converts it into actual purchase probabilities.

A survey might ask a question using a five-point scale such as:

Which is most true about product X?

___ I definitely would use product X
___ I probably would use product X
___ I might use product X
___ I probably would not use product X
___ I definitely would not use product X

A marketing researcher will first assign numerical values to these intention categories. If the numbers range from zero to one, they can be thought of as intent probabilities. This is a typical example:

definitely -> .99
probably -> .75
maybe -> .5
probably not -> .25
definitely not -> .01

Next, the researcher uses a predefined functional relationship to convert the stated intentions into estimates of actual purchase probabilities. The diagram that follows illustrates one such translation function. If a survey respondent were to choose a response of “definitely” and an intent probability of .99 was assigned to that category, then the actual probability of purchase could be read off the vertical axis. The translation function gives a value of about .8, indicating the specifiers of the function feel that not all people that claim they definitely intend to purchase will actually purchase.

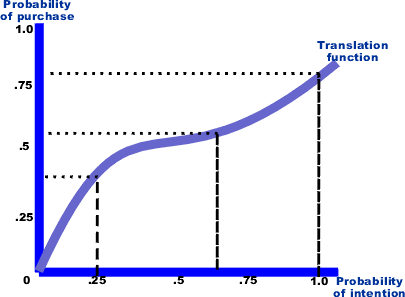

If a survey respondent were to choose a response of “probably not” and an intent probability of .25 was assigned to that category, then the actual probability of purchase could be read off the vertical axis as .35, indicating the specifiers of the function feel that some people that claim they probably will not purchase will actually purchase.

Other purchase intention/rating translations include logit analysis and the preference-rank translation.

== See also ==
- Marketing research
- New product development
- Preference regression
- Quantitative marketing research
