= Degree-of-difference =

Method to determine an overall difference among test and control groups

Degree of Difference Testing, also known as DOD, is a method to determine an overall difference among test and control groups when the product in question has exhibited variability that would have been caused because of multiple factors such as the production time, use of multiple components, preparation or others. It is one of the discrimination methods. It was introduced by Aust, L. B., Gacula Jr., M. C., Beard, S. A., and Washam II, R.W. in 1985. As a method, DOD is used when other traditional methods having a single control group fail and multiple control groups have to be introduced. DOD has hence replaced the traditional triangle test for products since those methods would give false results that are statistically significant in situations where the control variability is high. The primary disadvantage of DOD is that while it can provide a measure of difference, it is not able to determine the source of the differences and hence one won't know where to make corrections to reduce the variation.
