= Matched pair testing =

Matched pair testing is used to detect discrimination. The focus is to determine the presence of disparate treatment in the offering of goods and services during the sales process. Traditionally used to determine discrimination in housing and mortgage lending, the research methodology involves the use of pairs of testers or mystery shoppers, representing test and control cells. Control cells usually comprise non-protected classes of consumers and test cells comprise protected classes of consumers under the Fair Housing Act. For example, control cells comprise non-minority or male mystery shoppers while test cells comprise African American or Hispanic or female mystery shoppers. The mystery shoppers in each pair (e.g., African American and White) conduct the tests separately, but each is provided with profiles that are matched or very similar. The profiles typically contain financial, demographic and classification characteristics (gender and age) of the shopper. The shoppers in each pair perform the same inquiry and ask for the same information. The only difference is the test treatment, for example, the ethnicity or gender of the mystery shoppers. Prior to conducting the mystery shop, the mystery shoppers are trained on how to conduct the mystery shops, the use of the profile and how to record information pertaining to the treatment and information they will receive. After completing the mystery shop, the shoppers record the experience encountered and the information received on a questionnaire. The information entered on the questionnaires is entered into an electronic data base and the experiences of test and control mystery shoppers are compared.
