= Text graph =

Text-structure representation using graph models

In natural language processing (NLP), a text graph is a graph representation of a text item (document, passage or sentence). It is typically created as a preprocessing step to support NLP tasks such as text condensation term disambiguation (topic-based) text summarization, relation extraction and textual entailment.

== Representation ==
The semantics of what a text graph's nodes and edges represent can vary widely. Nodes for example can simply connect to tokenized words, or to domain-specific terms, or to entities mentioned in the text. The edges, on the other hand, can be between these text-based tokens or they can also link to a knowledge base.

== TextGraphs Workshop series ==
The TextGraphs Workshop series is a series of regular academic workshops intended to encourage the synergy between the fields of natural language processing (NLP) and graph theory. The mix between the two started small, with graph theoretical framework providing efficient and elegant solutions for NLP applications that focused on single documents for part-of-speech tagging, word-sense disambiguation and semantic role labelling, got progressively larger with ontology learning and information extraction from large text collections.

The 11th edition of the workshop (TextGraphs-11) will be collocated with the Annual Meeting of Association for Computational Linguistics (ACL 2017) in Vancouver, BC, Canada.

== Areas of interest ==
- Graph-based methods for providing reasoning and interpretation of deep learning methods
  - Graph-based methods for reasoning and interpreting deep processing by neural networks,
  - Explorations of the capabilities and limits of graph-based methods applied to neural networks in general
  - Investigation of which aspects of neural networks are not susceptible to graph-based methods.
- Graph-based methods for Information Retrieval, Information Extraction, and Text Mining
  - Graph-based methods for word sense disambiguation,
  - Graph-based representations for ontology learning,
  - Graph-based strategies for semantic relations identification,
  - Encoding semantic distances in graphs,
  - Graph-based techniques for text summarization, simplification, and paraphrasing
  - Graph-based techniques for document navigation and visualization
  - Reranking with graphs
  - Applications of label propagation algorithms, etc.
- New graph-based methods for NLP applications
  - Random walk methods in graphs
  - Spectral graph clustering
  - Semi-supervised graph-based methods
  - Methods and analyses for statistical networks
  - Small world graphs
  - Dynamic graph representations
  - Topological and pretopological analysis of graphs
  - Graph kernels, etc.
- Graph-based methods for applications on social networks
  - Rumor proliferation
  - E-reputation
  - Multiple identity detection
  - Language dynamics studies
  - Surveillance systems, etc.
- Graph-based methods for NLP and Semantic Web
  - Representation learning methods for knowledge graphs (i.e., knowledge graph embedding)
  - Using graphs-based methods to populate ontologies using textual data,
  - Inducing knowledge of ontologies into NLP applications using graphs,
  - Merging ontologies with graph-based methods using NLP techniques.

== See also ==
- Bag-of-words model
- Document classification
- Document-term matrix
- Hyperlinking
- Graph database
- Wiki
