= Logit analysis in marketing =

Logit analysis is a statistical technique used in marketing research. It can be applied with regression analysis to customer targeting and to assess effectiveness of promotional activities.

Used to assess the scope of customer acceptance of a new product, it attempts to determine the intensity or magnitude of customers' purchase intentions and translates that into a measure of actual buying behaviour. Logit analysis assumes that an unmet need in the marketplace has already been detected, and that the product has been designed to meet that need. The purpose of logit analysis is to quantify the potential sales of that product. It takes survey data on consumers' purchase intentions and converts it into actual purchase probabilities.

Logit analysis defines the functional relationship between stated purchase intentions and preferences, and the actual probability of purchase. A preference regression is performed on the survey data. This is then modified with actual historical observations of purchase behavior. The resultant functional relationship defines purchase probability.

This is the most useful of the purchase intention/rating translations because explicit measures of confidence level and statistical significance can be calculated. Other purchase intention/rating translations include the preference-rank translation and the intent scale translation. The logit function is the reciprocal function to the sigmoid logistic function.

== See also ==
- marketing research
- New product development
- marketing
- preference regression
- logit
- Comparison of statistical packages
