= Edward Altman =

American academic and corporate finance theorist

Edward I. Altman (born June 5, 1941) is a Professor of Finance, Emeritus, at New York University's Stern School of Business. He is best known for the development of the Altman Z-score for predicting bankruptcy which he published in 1968. Professor Altman is a leading academic on the High-Yield and Distressed Debt markets and is the pioneer in the building of models for credit risk management and bankruptcy prediction.

Altman used to teach "Bankruptcy and Reorganization" and "Credit Risk Management" in the Risk Management Open Enrollment program for Stern Executive Education. He also teaches in the school's MBA programs and has been a Stern faculty member since 1967.

== Research ==
The Altman Z-score is a multivariate formula for a measurement of the financial health of a company and a powerful diagnostic tool that forecasts the probability of a company entering bankruptcy. Studies measuring the effectiveness of the Z-Score have shown that the model has an 80%–90% reliability. Altman's equation did an excellent job at distinguishing bankrupt and non-bankrupt firms and is used by a large number of investment managers and hedge funds in their investment strategies and management. In addition, his Z-score model has been used by management of distressed companies to avoid having to file for bankruptcy reorganization. Altman's models have been used by banking institutions throughout the world in order to quantify the probability of default of their lending portfolios.

He compared owning the debt vs. equity for major companies that went bankrupt. The debt did better. One columnist wrote that a particular case was a goldmine for the debt and a landmine for the stock.

In the 1990s Altman and his PhD student Professor Edith Hotchkiss coined the term Chapter 22, which refers to companies which file for bankruptcy more than once. In a 1990 study he also defined the term "distressed debt securities," pertaining to firms whose bonds yield more than 10% above the "risk-free" government bond rate.

== Background ==
Altman holds a B.A. in Economics, (CCNY, 1963); an MBA (UCLA, 1965); and a Ph.D. in Finance (UCLA, 1967).

Altman was inducted into the Fixed Income Society's Hall of Fame in 2001 and was an inaugural inductee into the Turnaround Management's Hall of Fame in 2008. Altman has been awarded Honorary Doctorates from Lund University (Sweden) in 2011 and the Warsaw School of Economics in 2014. He also was named Honorary Professor by the University of Buenos Aires (Argentina) in 1996 and Vigo University (Spain) in 2017. He was named one of the "100 Most Influential People in Finance" by the Treasury & Risk Management magazine in 2005. He is also a co-founder of the International Risk Management Conference, which celebrated its 10th anniversary in 2017.

He is the brother of Stuart Altman, a noted health care economist, and Ellen Altman-Stein an MBA in Special Education.

== Books ==
Altman is the author, co-author, or editor of 25 books, including:

- Altman, Edward; Couette, J.; Narayanan, P; Nimmo, R. (2008). Managing Credit Risk, 2nd Edition. John Wiley and Sons. ISBN 978-0-470-11872-6.
- Altman, Edward; Edith Hotchkiss (2005). Corporate Financial Distress and Bankruptcy, 3rd edition. John Wiley and Sons. ISBN 0-471-55253-4.
- Altman, Edward; Edith Hotchkiss (2019). Corporate Financial Distress, Restructuring, and Bankruptcy, 4th edition. John Wiley and Sons. ISBN 978-1-119-48180-5.
- Altman, Edward (2005). A. Resti; A. Sironi (eds.). Recovery Risk. ISBN 1-904339-50-6.
- Altman, Edward (2002). Bankruptcy, Credit Risk and High Yield 'Junk' Bonds: A Compendium of Writings. Oxford, England and Malden, Massachusetts: Blackwell Publishing. ISBN 0-631-22563-3.
- Altman, Edward; Roggi O. (2013). Measuring and Managing Risk. Emerging Global Standards and Regulations After the Financial Crisis. World Scientific Press LPP - Singapore. ISBN 978-981-4417-49-5.
- Altman Z-score
