= Texture discrimination task =

Visual perception learning task

The texture discrimination task is a common task used in visual perception learning. In this task, the subject must respond to the central letter task (in order to ensure that the subject remains fixated on the letter) and then identify the orientation of a target array in a peripheral location of the test stimulus.

The test stimulus and mask stimulus (composed of randomly oriented V-shaped patterns) are separated by a period of time known as the stimulus-to-mask onset asynchrony. The shorter the stimulus-to-mask onset asynchrony, the more difficult the task becomes.

A 2015 study has shown that action gamers typically do better than non-gamers in this task.
