= Harold Borko =

American psychologist and information scientist (1922-2012)

Harold Borko (1922-2012) was an American psychologist and researcher working primarily in the field of information science.

== Biography ==
Borko was born in 1922 in New York City, New York. After serving in the US Army from 1942 to 1946 he obtained a BA in Psychology from the University of California, Los Angeles in 1948 and both his MA and PhD from the University of Southern California in Psychology in 1952. He returned to the army as a psychologist until 1956 after which he began a career working in and teaching information science. He died in California in 2012.

== Information Science Career ==
After leaving the military Borko began working at the RAND Corporation as a Systems Training Specialist in 1956 and moved to the Systems Development Corporation a year later working in the Language Processing and Retrieval department. Alongside this work he taught Psychology at USC from 1957-65 and then moved into teaching Library Science at UCLA from 1965. In 1967 Borko left his role at the Systems Development Corporation and continued as a full-time professor at UCLA until his retirement in 1993.. From 1961 to 1995 Borko authored and co-authored over 100 articles on new developments in the field as well as the historiography of information science. He served as an editor of the Journal of Educational Data Processing from 1963-1975 and as President of the American Society for Information Science in 1966

== Partial list of works ==
- Borko, H. (1962, May). The construction of an empirically based mathematically derived classification system. In Proceedings of the May 1-3, 1962, spring joint computer conference (pp. 279-289).
- Borko, H., & Bernick, M. (1963). Automatic document classification. Journal of the ACM (JACM), 10(2), 151-162.
- Borko, H. (1964). The Storage and Retrieval of Educational Information. Journal of Teacher Education, 15(4), 449-452.
- Borko, H. (1964). Measuring the reliability of subject classification by men and machines. American Documentation, 15(4), 268-273.
- Borko, H. (1965). The conceptual foundations of information systems.
- Borko, H. (1968), Information science: What is it?^{†}. Amer. Doc., 19: 3-5. https://doi.org/10.1002/asi.5090190103
- Borko, H. (1970). Experiments in book indexing by computer. Information storage and retrieval, 6(1), 5-16.
- Borko, H. (1985). An introduction to computer-based library systems (Lucy A. Tedd). Education for Information, 3(1), 61.
