= Discrimination testing =

Technique employed in sensory analysis

Discrimination testing is a technique employed in sensory analysis to determine whether there is a detectable difference among two or more products. The test uses a group of assessors (panellists) with a degree of training appropriate to the complexity of the test to discriminate from one product to another through one of a variety of experimental designs. Though useful, these tests typically do not quantify or describe any differences, requiring a more specifically trained panel under different study design to describe differences and assess significance of the difference.

== Statistical basis ==
The statistical principle behind any discrimination test should be to reject a null hypothesis (H_{0}) that states there is no detectable difference between two (or more) products. If there is sufficient evidence to reject H_{0} in favor of the alternative hypothesis, H_{A}: There is a detectable difference, then a difference can be recorded. However, failure to reject H_{0} should not be assumed to be sufficient evidence to accept it. H_{0} is formulated on the premise that all of the assessors guessed when they made their response. The statistical test chosen should give a probability value that the result was arrived at through pure guesswork. If this probability is sufficiently low (usually below 0.05 or 5%) then H_{0} can be rejected in favor of H_{A}.

Tests used to decide whether or not to reject H_{0} include binomial, χ^{2} (Chi-squared), t-test etc.

== Types of test ==
A number of tests can be classified as discrimination tests. If it's designed to detect a difference then it's a discrimination test. The type of test determines the number of samples presented to each member of the panel and also the question(s) they are asked to respond to.

Schematically, these tests may be described as follows; A & B are used for knowns, X and Y are used for different unknowns, while (AB) means that the order of presentation is unknown:

Paired comparison
XY or (AB) – two unknown samples, known to be different, test is which satisfies some criterion (X or Y); unlike the others this is not an equality test.
Duo-trio
AXY – one known, two unknown, test is which unknown is the known (X = A or Y = A)
Triangle
(XXY) – three unknowns, test is which is odd one out (Y = 1, Y = 2, or Y = 3).
ABX
ABX – two knowns, one unknown, test is which of the knowns the unknown is (X = A or X = B).
Duo-trio in constant reference mode
(AB)X – three unknowns, where it is stated that the first two are different, but which is which is not identified, test is which of the first two the third is (X = 1 or X = 2).
Tetrad
(XXYY) - four unknowns, test is to create groups of size two based on similarity (XX = (1,2), XX = (1,3) or XX = (1,4)). Like the triangle test, this technique has a 1/3 probability that a random guess is correct. However, the tetrad test in some cases requires only one third the number of overall participants to establish statistical significance compared to the triangle test.

== See also ==
- Detection theory
