= Multiple discriminant analysis =

Mathematical algorithm

Multiple Discriminant Analysis (MDA) is a multivariate dimensionality reduction technique. It has been used to predict signals as diverse as neural memory traces and corporate failure.

MDA is not directly used to perform classification. It merely supports classification by yielding a compressed signal amenable to classification. The method described in Duda et al. (2001) §3.8.3 projects the multivariate signal down to an M−1 dimensional space where M is the number of categories.

MDA is useful because most classifiers are strongly affected by the curse of dimensionality. In other words, when signals are represented in very-high-dimensional spaces, the classifier's performance is catastrophically impaired by the overfitting problem. This problem is reduced by compressing the signal down to a lower-dimensional space as MDA does.

MDA has been used to reveal neural codes.
