= Sally Shaywitz =

American physician-scientist

Sally E. Shaywitz
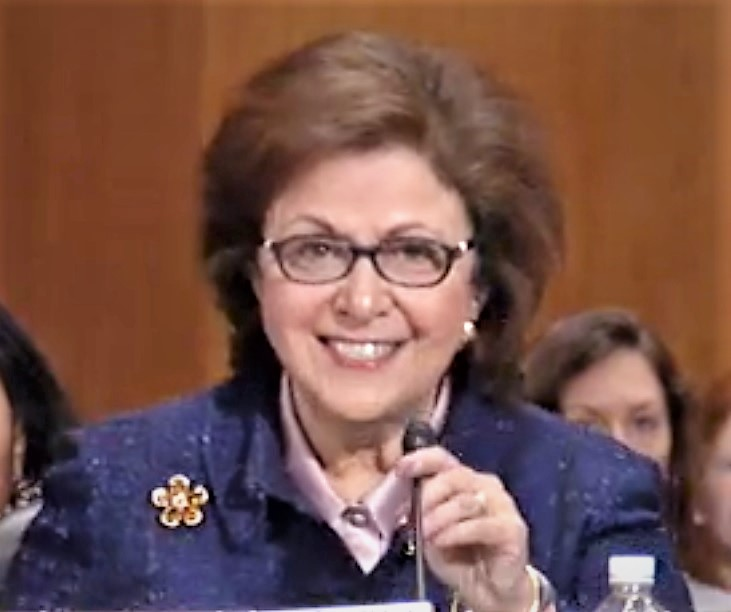
- Shaywitz in 2016
- Born: 1942 (age 83–84); The Bronx
- Education: City University of New York; Albert Einstein College of Medicine
- Scientific career
- Workplaces: Yale University

Sally Shaywitz (born 1942) is an American physician-scientist who is the Audrey G. Ratner Professor in Learning Development at Yale University. She is the co-founder and co-director of the Yale Center for Dyslexia & Creativity. Her research provides the framework for modern understanding of dyslexia.

== Early life and education ==
Shaywitz was born and raised in The Bronx. She is the daughter of two Eastern European immigrants. Her father was a dressmaker and her mother a homemaker. She earned her undergraduate degree at City College of New York, and originally considered a career in law. She was accepted early to the Albert Einstein College of Medicine. That year her mother was diagnosed with endometrial cancer, and died just before Shaywitz started her medical studies. When Shaywitz joined medical school, she was one of four women in a class of one hundred students. Shaywitz completed her residency in pediatrics and developmental pediatrics. Alongside completing her training, Shaywitz had three children, whom she raised in Westport, Connecticut.

== Research and career ==
Shaywitz started her medical career seeing patients out of her home in suburban Connecticut. She was eventually recruited by Yale University to look after patients with learning disorders, including dyslexia. In 1979 she was recruited by Yale University to see patients with learning disorders, including dyslexia. Her research involves longitudinal epidemiological and neurobiological studies. In 1983 she started tracking a random cohort of children continuously from kindergarten to their current age in their 40s. The longitudinal study data also showed that the achievement gap in reading between typical and dyslexic students occurs early – in first grade and persists. This finding impelled her to develop an evidence-based efficient screener to identify at risk beginning in kindergarten.

In 1983 she started tracking a cohort of people from kindergarten to adulthood, a study which became known as The Connecticut Longitudinal Study. She showed that boys and girls were equally as likely to be affected by dyslexia. These studies allowed Shaywitz to identify a neural signature of dyslexia, as well as demonstrating that dyslexia is not simply a reading disorder young people 'outgrow'. According to Shaywitz, dyslexia arises due to inefficient function in the neural systems responsible for skilled reading. Shaywitz developed the "Sea of Strengths" model, which explains that dyslexia is a deficit in language processing. Her research identified that there is no connection between dyslexia and intelligence so that you can be very smart and still read very slowly.

In 2003 Shaywitz published Overcoming Dyslexia, a book which helps people identify, understand and overcome challenges in reading. In 2020 she, together with her son, psychiatrist, Jonathan Shaywitz, published the much updated Overcoming Dyslexia 2nd edition.

== Awards and honors ==
- 1995 Albert Einstein College of Medicine Distinguished Alumnus Award
- 1998 Elected member of the National Academy of Medicine
- 1998 Society for Women's Health Research Achievement Award in Women's Health
- 1999 American Academy of Child and Adolescent Psychiatry Sidney Berman Award
- 2003 Margot Marek Book Award
- 2004 City College of New York Townsend Harris Medal
- 2005 Williams College Honorary Doctor of Science degree
- 2012 Samuel Torrey Orton Award (jointly with Bennett Shaywitz)
- 2017 Liberty Science Center Genius Award
- 2020 Elected Fellow of the American Association for the Advancement of Science

== Selected publications ==
As of 2018, the definition of dyslexia as unexpected is codified in U.S. federal law (U.S. Public Law 115-391): The term “dyslexia” means an unexpected difficulty in reading for an individual who has the intelligence to be a much better reader, most commonly caused by a difficulty in the phonological processing (the appreciation of the individual sounds of spoken language), which affects the ability of an individual to speak, read, and spell.

- Shaywitz, Sally; Shaywitz, Bennett; Jack M. Fletcher; Escobar, Michael David (1990). "Prevalence of Reading Disability in Boys and Girls". JAMA. 264 (8): 998. doi:10.1001/jama.1990.03450080084036. Wikidata Q105531840.
- Shaywitz, Sally; Shaywitz, Bennett (2005). "Dyslexia (specific reading disability)". Biological Psychiatry. 57 (11): 1301–1309. doi:10.1016/j.biopsych.2005.01.043. PMID 15950002. Wikidata Q30991872.

== Personal life ==
Shaywitz is married to Bennett Shaywitz, a pediatric neurologist who headed that section at Yale from 1976 to 2015 and with whom she co-founded the Yale Center for Dyslexia & Creativity. They met and were married in 1963.
