= Arthur Zimek =

German computer scientist

- Education: LMU Munich
- Scientific career
- Fields: outlier detection, correlation clustering
- Workplaces: University of Southern Denmark, University of Alberta, LMU Munich
- Doctoral advisor: Hans-Peter Kriegel

Arthur Zimek is a professor in data mining, data science and machine learning at the University of Southern Denmark in Odense, Denmark.

He graduated from LMU Munich in Germany, where he worked with Prof. Hans-Peter Kriegel. His dissertation on "Correlation Clustering" was awarded the "SIGKDD Doctoral Dissertation Award 2009 Runner-up" by the Association for Computing Machinery.

He is well known for his work on outlier detection, density-based clustering, correlation clustering, and the curse of dimensionality.

He is one of the founders and core developers of the open-source ELKI data mining framework.
