= Martin Ester =

Canadian-German computing researcher

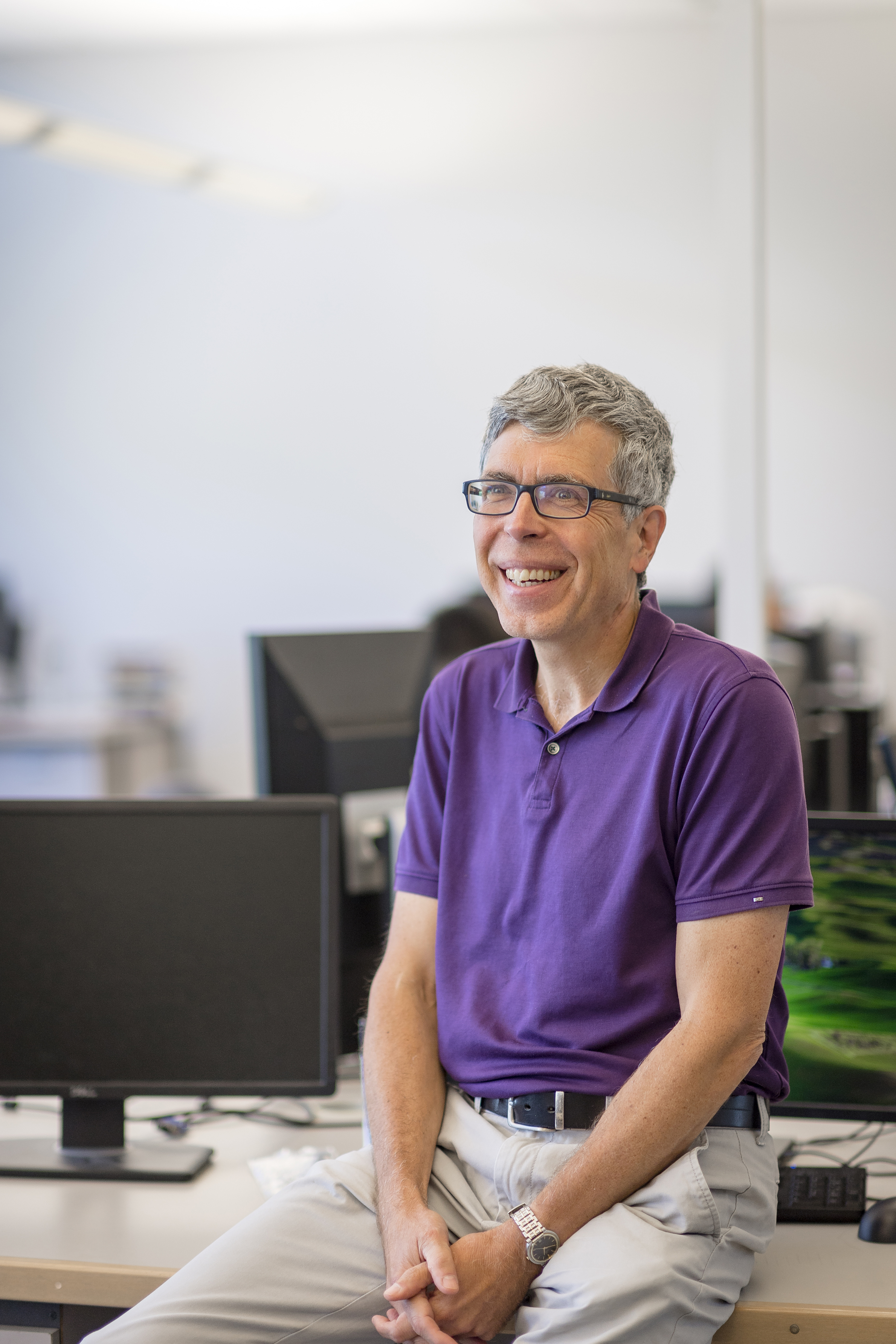
- Ester in 2019
- Born: November 5, 1958 (age 67); Essen, Germany
- Children: 2

Academic background
- Education: MS.c., Technical University of Dortmund; PhD, ETH Zurich
- Thesis: Konsistenzwerkzeuge für PROLOG-Wissensbasen (1989)

Academic work
- Institutions: LMU Munich; Simon Fraser University
- Notable ideas: DBSCAN

Martin Ester FRSC (born November 5, 1958) is a Canadian-German Professor of Computing Science at Simon Fraser University in British Columbia, Canada. His research focuses on data mining and machine learning.

== Career ==
After earning his MS.c., Ester worked for Swissair before being appointed an assistant professor at LMU Munich in 1993. In 1996, Ester, Hans-Peter Kriegel, Jörg Sander and Xiaowei Xu proposed a data clustering algorithm called "Density-based spatial clustering of applications with noise" (DBSCAN). Their proposal won the 2014 KDD Test of Time Award for "outstanding papers from past KDD Conferences beyond the last decade that have had an important impact on the data mining research community."

A few years later, Ester moved to a position at Simon Fraser University (SFU) in Vancouver. In 2009, he became an associate editor of the IEEE Transactions on Knowledge and Data Engineering.

Between 2010 and 2015, Ester served as the SFU School of Computing Science director. In 2016, ArnetMiner listed Ester as the world's most influential scholar in data mining. At the time, Arnetminer recorded that Ester authored 169 papers, which gained more than 21,000 citations, and reaching 50 on the H-index. Besides working as a professor at SFU, Ester heads research at British Columbia Children's Hospital regarding genetic influence in drug reception and reactions in patients. His research team received a $9.9 million grant from Genome Canada's 2017 Large-Scale Applied Research Project Competition: Genomics and Precision Health.

As a result of his research, Ester was elected a Fellow of the Royal Society of Canada in 2019.
