= John A. Hartigan =

Australian-American statistician (born 1937)

John Anthony Hartigan
- Born: July 2, 1937 (age 89); Sydney, Australia
- Education: University of Sydney; Princeton University
- Known for: Biclustering
- Scientific career
- Workplaces: Princeton University; Yale University
- Doctoral advisor: John Tukey; Frank Anscombe
- Doctoral students: Bill Eddy; Michael D. Escobar
- Website: www.stat.yale.edu/~jah49/

John Anthony Hartigan (born July 2, 1937) is an Australian-American statistician, the Eugene Higgins Professor of Statistics emeritus at Yale University. He made fundamental contributions to clustering algorithms, including the famous Hartigan-Wong method and biclustering, and Bayesian statistics.

== Education and career ==
Hartigan was born in Sydney, Australia and studied mathematics at the University of Sydney, where he obtained his BSc in 1959 and MSc in 1960. Afterwards, he moved to Princeton University, where he studied under John Tukey and Frank Anscombe. He obtained his PhD in statistics at Princeton in 1962. He joined the faculty of Princeton University in 1964 as an assistant professor and moved to Yale University in 1969, when he became an associate professor. He gained full professorship at Yale in 1972. He was the chair at Yale's department of statistics from 1973 to 1975 and again from 1988 to 1994.

At Yale, Hartigan played an important leadership role in the development of the Department of Statistics. He served as chair of the department from 1973 to 1975 and again from 1988 to 1994, providing leadership during two important periods in its development. Beyond his role as department chair, Hartigan was instrumental in establishing Yale’s Social Sciences Statistical Laboratory, which he directed from 1985 to 1989 and again from 1991 to 1993. The laboratory reflected his strong commitment to bringing statistical methods and computing into practical data analysis and teaching across the social sciences. Yale later recognized that Hartigan’s influence extended well beyond administration: he supervised approximately 40 dissertations and helped establish statistical data analysis as an important component of interdisciplinary research and education at Yale.

== Bibliography ==
=== Books ===
- Hartigan, John A. (1975). Clustering algorithms. New York: Wiley. ISBN 0-471-35645-X. OCLC 995140.
- Hartigan, John A. (1983). Bayes theory. New York: Springer-Verlag. ISBN 3-540-90883-8. OCLC 9557182.

=== Selected papers ===
- Hartigan, J. (1964). "Invariant Prior Distributions". The Annals of Mathematical Statistics. 35 (2): 836–845. doi:10.1214/aoms/1177703583. ISSN 0003-4851.
- Hartigan, J. A. (1972). "Direct Clustering of a Data Matrix". Journal of the American Statistical Association. 67 (337): 123–129. doi:10.1080/01621459.1972.10481214. ISSN 0162-1459.
- Hartigan, J. A.; Wong, M. A. (1979). "Algorithm AS 136: A K-Means Clustering Algorithm". Applied Statistics. 28 (1): 100. doi:10.2307/2346830. JSTOR 2346830.
- Kleiner, B.; Hartigan, J. A. (1981). "Representing Points in Many Dimensions by Trees and Castles". Journal of the American Statistical Association. 76 (374): 260–269. doi:10.1080/01621459.1981.10477638. ISSN 0162-1459.
- Hartigan, J. A.; Hartigan, P. M. (1985). "The Dip Test of Unimodality". The Annals of Statistics. 13 (1). doi:10.1214/aos/1176346577. ISSN 0090-5364.
- Hartigan, J. A. (1985). "Statistical theory in clustering". Journal of Classification. 2 (1): 63–76. doi:10.1007/BF01908064. ISSN 0176-4268. S2CID 122472570.
