= Clustering high-dimensional data =

Method of data analysis

Clustering high-dimensional data is the cluster analysis of data with anywhere from a few dozen to many thousands of dimensions. Such high-dimensional spaces of data are often encountered in areas such as medicine, where DNA microarray technology can produce many measurements at once, and the clustering of text documents, where, if a word-frequency vector is used, the number of dimensions equals the size of the vocabulary.

== Problems ==
Four problems need to be overcome for clustering in high-dimensional data:

- Multiple dimensions are hard to think in, impossible to visualize, and, due to the exponential growth of the number of possible values with each dimension, complete enumeration of all subspaces becomes intractable with increasing dimensionality. This problem is known as the curse of dimensionality.
- The concept of distance becomes less precise as the number of dimensions grows, since the distance between any two points in a given dataset converges. The discrimination of the nearest and farthest point in particular becomes meaningless:

$$\lim_{d \to \infty} \frac{\mathit{dist}_\max - \mathit{dist}_\min}{\mathit{dist}_\min} = 0$$

- A cluster is intended to group objects that are related, based on observations of their attribute's values. However, given a large number of attributes some of the attributes will usually not be meaningful for a given cluster. For example, in newborn screening a cluster of samples might identify newborns that share similar blood values, which might lead to insights about the relevance of certain blood values for a disease. But for different diseases, different blood values might form a cluster, and other values might be uncorrelated. This is known as the local feature relevance problem: different clusters might be found in different subspaces, so a global filtering of attributes is not sufficient.
- Given a large number of attributes, it is likely that some attributes are correlated. Hence, clusters might exist in arbitrarily oriented affine subspaces.

Recent research indicates that the discrimination problems only occur when there is a high number of irrelevant dimensions, and that shared-nearest-neighbor approaches can improve results.

== Approaches ==
Approaches towards clustering in axis-parallel or arbitrarily oriented affine subspaces differ in how they interpret the overall goal, which is finding clusters in data with high dimensionality. An overall different approach is to find clusters based on pattern in the data matrix, often referred to as biclustering, which is a technique frequently utilized in bioinformatics.

=== Subspace clustering ===
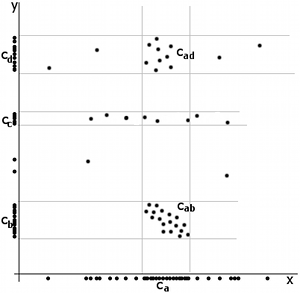
Example 2D space with subspace clusters

Subspace clustering aims to look for clusters in different combinations of dimensions (i.e., subspaces) and unlike many other clustering approaches does not assume that all of the clusters in a dataset are found in the same set of dimensions. Subspace clustering can take bottom-up or top-down approaches. Bottom-up methods (such as CLIQUE) heuristically identify relevant dimensions by dividing the data space into a grid structure, selecting dense units, and then iteratively linking them if they are adjacent and dense.

The adjacent image shows a mere two-dimensional space where a number of clusters can be identified. In the one-dimensional subspaces, the clusters $c_a$ (in subspace $\{x\}$) and $c_b$, $c_c$, $c_d$ (in subspace $\{y\}$) can be found. $c_c$ cannot be considered a cluster in a two-dimensional (sub-)space, since it is too sparsely distributed in the $x$ axis. In two dimensions, the two clusters $c_{ab}$ and $c_{ad}$ can be identified.

The problem of subspace clustering is given by the fact that there are $2^d$ different subspaces of a space with $d$ dimensions. If the subspaces are not axis-parallel, an infinite number of subspaces is possible. Hence, subspace clustering algorithms utilize some kind of heuristic to remain computationally feasible, at the risk of producing inferior results. For example, the downward-closure property (cf. association rules) can be used to build higher-dimensional subspaces only by combining lower-dimensional ones, as any subspace T containing a cluster, will result in a full space S also to contain that cluster (i.e. S ⊆ T), an approach taken by most of the traditional algorithms such as CLIQUE, SUBCLU. It is also possible to define a subspace using different degrees of relevance for each dimension, an approach taken by iMWK-Means, EBK-Modes and CBK-Modes.

=== Projected clustering ===
Projected clustering seeks to assign each point to a unique cluster, but clusters may exist in different subspaces. The general approach is to use a special distance function together with a regular clustering algorithm.

For example, the PreDeCon algorithm checks which attributes seem to support a clustering for each point, and adjusts the distance function such that dimensions with low variance are amplified in the distance function. In the figure above, the cluster $c_c$ might be found using DBSCAN with a distance function that places less emphasis on the $x$-axis and thus exaggerates the low difference in the $y$-axis sufficiently enough to group the points into a cluster.

PROCLUS uses a similar approach with a k-medoid clustering. Initial medoids are guessed, and for each medoid the subspace spanned by attributes with low variance is determined. Points are assigned to the medoid closest, considering only the subspace of that medoid in determining the distance. The algorithm then proceeds as the regular PAM algorithm.

If the distance function weights attributes differently, but never with 0 (and hence never drops irrelevant attributes), the algorithm is called a "soft"-projected clustering algorithm.

=== Projection-based clustering ===
Projection-based clustering is based on a nonlinear projection of high-dimensional data into a two-dimensional space. Typical projection-methods like t-distributed stochastic neighbor embedding (t-SNE), or neighbor retrieval visualizer (NerV) are used to project data explicitly into two dimensions disregarding the subspaces of higher dimension than two and preserving only relevant neighborhoods in high-dimensional data. In the next step, the Delaunay graph between the projected points is calculated, and each vertex between two projected points is weighted with the high-dimensional distance between the corresponding high-dimensional data points. Thereafter the shortest path between every pair of points is computed using the Dijkstra algorithm. The shortest paths are then used in the clustering process, which involves two choices depending on the structure type in the high-dimensional data. This Boolean choice can be decided by looking at the topographic map of high-dimensional structures. In a benchmarking of 34 comparable clustering methods, projection-based clustering was the only algorithm that always was able to find the high-dimensional distance or density-based structure of the dataset. Projection-based clustering is accessible in the open-source R package "ProjectionBasedClustering" on CRAN.

=== Bootstrap-based clustering ===
Bootstrap aggregation (bagging) can be used to create multiple clusters and aggregate the findings. This is done by taking random subsamples of the data, performing a cluster analysis on each of them and then aggregating the results of the clusterings to generate a dissimilarity measure which can then be used to explore and cluster the original data. Since high-dimensional data are likely to have many non-informative features, weights can be used during the bagging process to increase the impact of the more informative aspects. This produces "ABC dissimilarities" which can then be used to explore and cluster the original data and also to assess which features appear to be more impactful in defining the clusters.

=== Hybrid approaches ===
Not all algorithms try to either find a unique cluster assignment for each point or all clusters in all subspaces; many settle for a result in between, where a number of possibly overlapping, but not necessarily exhaustive set of clusters are found. An example is FIRES, which is from its basic approach a subspace clustering algorithm, but uses a heuristic too aggressive to credibly produce all subspace clusters. Another hybrid approach is to include a human-into-the-algorithmic-loop: Human domain expertise can help to reduce an exponential search space through heuristic selection of samples. This can be beneficial in the health domain where, e.g., medical doctors are confronted with high-dimensional descriptions of patient conditions and measurements on the success of certain therapies. An important question in such data is to compare and correlate patient conditions and therapy results along with combinations of dimensions. The number of dimensions is often very large, consequently one needs to map them to a smaller number of relevant dimensions to be more amenable for expert analysis. This is because irrelevant, redundant, and conflicting dimensions can negatively affect effectiveness and efficiency of the whole analytic process.

=== Correlation clustering ===
Another type of subspaces is considered in Correlation clustering (Data Mining).

== Software ==
- ELKI includes various subspace and correlation clustering algorithms
- FCPS includes over fifty clustering algorithms
