= Hans-Peter Kriegel =

German computer scientist

- Born: 1 October 1948 (age 77); Germany
- Education: Karlsruhe Institute of Technology
- Known for: R*-tree, X-tree, DBSCAN, OPTICS, LOF
- Awards: ACM Fellow, IEEE ICDM Research Contributions Award, ACM SIGKDD Innovation Award
- Scientific career
- Fields: Computer Science (Data mining, spatial data management)
- Workplaces: Technical University of Dortmund, University of Bremen, University of Würzburg, LMU Munich
- Thesis: Erzeugung von Übersetzungen durch Grammatikpaare (1976)
- Doctoral advisor: Hermann Maurer
- Doctoral students: Daniel A. Keim; Arthur Zimek; Karsten Borgwardt

Hans-Peter Kriegel (1 October 1948, Germany) is a German computer scientist and professor at LMU Munich and leading the Database Systems Group in the Department of Computer Science. He was previously professor at the University of Würzburg and the University of Bremen after habilitation at the Technical University of Dortmund and doctorate from Karlsruhe Institute of Technology.

== Research ==
His most important contributions are the database index structures R*-tree, X-tree and IQ-Tree, the cluster analysis algorithms DBSCAN, OPTICS and SUBCLU and the anomaly detection method Local Outlier Factor (LOF).

His research is focused around correlation clustering, high-dimensional data indexing and analysis, spatial data mining and spatial data management as well as multimedia databases.

His research group developed a software framework titled ELKI that is designed for the parallel research of index structures, data mining algorithms and their interaction, such as optimized data mining algorithms based on database indexes.

== Awards ==
In 2009 the Association for Computing Machinery appointed Hans-Peter Kriegel a "fellow", one of its highest honors. He has been honored in particular for his contributions to "knowledge discovery and data mining, similarity search, spatial data management, and access methods for high-dimensional data".

He received the 2013 IEEE ICDM Research Contributions Award for his research on data mining algorithms such as DBSCAN, OPTICS, Local Outlier Factor and his work on mining high-dimensional data.

He was also awarded the 2015 ACM SIGKDD Innovation Award for his contributions to data mining in clustering, outlier detection and high-dimensional data analysis, in particular for density-based approaches. DBSCAN also received the 2014 ACM SIGKDD test of time award.

As of 2005, he was the most cited German researcher in databases, and data mining.
