= Michael D. Escobar =

- Education: Tufts University (BA), Yale University (PhD)
- Known for: Bayesian nonparametrics, mixture models
- Awards: Fellow of the American Statistical Association (2015); Robin Badgley Award for Teaching Excellence (2012/13)
- Scientific career
- Fields: Biostatistics, Bayesian statistics
- Institutions: University of Toronto
- Doctoral advisor: John Hartigan

Michael David Escobar is an American biostatistician and professor in the Biostatistics Division at the University of Toronto's Dalla Lana School of Public Health. He is known for work on Bayesian nonparametrics and mixture models.

== Education and career ==
Escobar earned a degree in mathematics at Tufts University in 1981 followed by a doctorate in statistics at Yale University in 1988 under the supervision of John Hartigan. Between 1990 and 1994, he was an assistant professor at Carnegie Mellon University. Escobar subsequently joined the University of Toronto faculty, where he became a tenured professor in the Biostatistics Division at the Dalla Lana School of Public Health and held a cross-appointment in the Department of Statistical Sciences. He has taught the graduate course Applied Bayesian Methods at Toronto. In 2012/13, he received the Robin Badgley Award for Teaching Excellence (Open). In 2015, he was elected a fellow of the American Statistical Association.

== Research ==
University of Toronto sources describe Escobar's research as focusing on computation for Dirichlet process models in nonparametric Bayesian statistics, mixture models for heterogeneous populations, psychiatric applications, and broader statistical work in the medical, biological, and public health sciences.

== Selected works ==
- Escobar, Michael D. (1994). "Estimating Normal Means with a Dirichlet Process Prior". Journal of the American Statistical Association. 89 (425): 268–277. doi:10.1080/01621459.1994.10476468. ISSN 0162-1459.
- Escobar, Michael D.; West, Mike (1995). "Bayesian Density Estimation and Inference Using Mixtures". Journal of the American Statistical Association. 90 (430): 577–588. doi:10.1080/01621459.1995.10476550. ISSN 0162-1459.
- Roeder, Kathryn; Escobar, Michael; Kadane, Joseph; Balazs, Ildiko (1998). "Measuring Heterogeneity in Forensic Databases". Biometrika. 85 (2): 269–287. doi:10.1093/biomet/85.2.269.
- Escobar, Michael D.; West, Mike (1998). "Computing Nonparametric Hierarchical Models". In Dey, Dipak; Müller, Peter; Sinha, Debajyoti (eds.). Practical Nonparametric and Semiparametric Bayesian Statistics. New York: Springer. pp. 1–22. doi:10.1007/978-1-4612-1732-9_1. ISBN 978-0-387-98517-6.
- Austin, Peter C.; Escobar, Michael; Kopec, Jacek A. (2000). "The use of the Tobit model for analyzing measures of health status". Quality of Life Research. 9 (8): 901–910. doi:10.1023/A:1008938326604. PMID 11284209.
