= Al-maryamiyyun =

Al-maryamiyyun or Maryamites an Arab Christian sect that appeared in the Arabian Peninsula believed in three gods: God, Jesus, and Mary. It is said that they believed in a trinity, with Mary being part of a trinity. It is believed that they were mentioned in the Quran, where their deification of Jesus and Mary was condemned. Some researchers and scientists belief that the Al-maryamiyyun are the same as the Collyridianism sect that appeared in the fourth century, while some believe that they are two different sects

Unlike Collyridianism, the Al-maryamiyyun sect in historical sources does not mention that its followers were women; rather, its followers are considered to be both men and women, and it is not mentioned that they offered cakes as a sacrifice to Mary. Some scholars believe it that the Al-maryamiyyun became extinct in the seventh century as a result of the spread of the religion of Islam.

== Name meaning ==
Anastase-Marie al-Karmali, a Catholic priest, Carmelite monk, and Iraqi Arab linguist, stated that the Marianite sect had more than one name. The name Marianism is derived from the name Marion, a diminutive of Maryam (Mary) in the Aramaic language. Saliba ibn Yuhanna mentioned them by this name, and also referred to them as the Maryamites, also in the Aramaic language. Ibn Taymiyyah mentioned them by this term, and then referred to them as the Marmiya, an Arabicized form of Maryam. He also mentioned that Sa'id ibn al-Batriq referred to them by this name, and also as the Barbarāniyyah, saying that the Arameans called them this because the Marians were Bedouin.

== Origin and beliefs ==
Helmy Yaacoub, a Hegumen and researcher of religions in the Coptic Orthodox Church, believes that the origin of a sect was that they worshipped the planet Venus and offered it barley bread as a sacrifice. When they embraced Christianity, they made Mary part of the Trinity. He assumes that the sect continued to exist until the seventh century and he mentions it by the names of the Maryamites and the Collyridianism, which indicates that he considers them to be the same sect.

According to Ishtar TV, these were pagan Egyptians who believed in Osiris, Isis, and Horus. They reconciled their beliefs with Christianity by creating a trinity consisting of the Father, Mary, and Jesus. They believed that Mary was the wife of the Father who gave birth to Jesus the Son. This sect died out in the 7th century due to the Muslims and it is believed that the Collyridianism and the Mariamites are the same sect.

== Historical sources ==
In Arabic sources, when the Mariamite sect is mentioned, they only indicate that they believed Mary to be a goddess, and do not mention that they offered cakes as a sacrifice to her or that they had female followers. Eutychius of Alexandria, a Melkite Patriarch of Alexandria, is considered the oldest source mentioning an Al-Maryamiyyun sect, and he stated that the sect had two names: the Barbarāniyyah (Arabic: البربرانية) and the Maryamiyyūn, he pointed out that this is a sect that believes that Jesus and Mary are two gods The Muslim scholar Ibn Taymiyyah quoted and transmitted in his book, from Eutychius of Alexandria in his book Al-Jawāb al-Ṣaḥīḥ li-man baddala dīn al-Masīḥ

John of Damascus mentions in his book The Fountain of Knowledge this sect, but versions of the book differ slightly in content due to variations in manuscripts. Some manuscripts mention the Collyridianism sect and state that it was named so because it offered cakes to Mary, but he does not mention that it was a sect composed of women's, nor does he mention that it believed Mary to be a goddess. There are manuscripts that mention the Maryamites sect, stating that they were in the Arabian Peninsula and believed that Mary was a goddess and that she gave birth to the god Jesus.

Al-Tabari quoted al-Suddi on the belief of a Christian sect that Mary was a goddess. Qatadah ibn Di'amah also mentioned them and Ibn Abi Zamanin Al-Wahidi quoted Ibn al-Anbari as saying that there were Christians who worshipped God, Jesus, and Mary. Shaykh Tusi said in his book Al-Tibyan Fi Tafsir al-Quran that Christians told him that they asked Catholicos about the Marianite sect, and he said that he had doubted that they were a real sect, but he found that mention them in book. Al-Ya'qubi mentioned in his book, "Tārīkh Ibn Wāḍiḥ," that there was a group of Christians who believed that Jesus and Mary were two gods.

The Muslim scholar Ibn Hazm mentions in his book Al-Fisal fi al-Milal wa al-Nihal sect, but only by the name of the Barbaraniyyah, who believe that Mary and Jesus are gods.
