= Linde–Buzo–Gray algorithm =

The Linde–Buzo–Gray algorithm (named after its creators Yoseph Linde, Andrés Buzo and Robert M. Gray, who designed it in 1980) is an iterative vector quantization algorithm to improve a small set of vectors (codebook) to represent a larger set of vectors (training set), such that it will be locally optimal. It combines Lloyd's Algorithm with a splitting technique in which larger codebooks are built from smaller codebooks by splitting each code vector in two. The core idea of the algorithm is that by splitting the codebook such that all code vectors from the previous codebook are present, the new codebook must be as good as the previous one or better.

== Description ==
The Linde–Buzo–Gray algorithm may be implemented as follows:

algorithm linde-buzo-gray is
    input: set of training vectors training, codebook to improve old-codebook
    output: codebook that is twice the size and better or as good as old-codebook
    
    new-codebook ← {}
    
    for each old-codevector in old-codebook do
        insert old-codevector into new-codebook
        insert old-codevector + 𝜖 into new-codebook where 𝜖 is a small vector
    
    return lloyd(new-codebook, training)

algorithm lloyd is
    input: codebook to improve, set of training vectors training
    output: improved codebook
    
    do
        previous-codebook ← codebook
        
        clusters ← divide training into |codebook| clusters, where each cluster contains all vectors in training who are best represented by the corresponding vector in codebook
        
        for each cluster cluster in clusters do
            the corresponding code vector in codebook ← the centroid of all training vectors in cluster
        
    while difference in error representing training between codebook and previous-codebook > 𝜖
    
    return codebook
