= SIMT =

The abbreviation SIMT may mean:

- School of International Management and Technology
- Stuttgart Institute of Management and Technology
- Single instruction, multiple threads, relates to single instruction, multiple data (SIMD)
- Saigon Institute of Management and Technology
- The South Island Main Trunk Railway in New Zealand
