= Ron Shamir =

Israeli professor of computer science (born 1953)

- רון שמיר
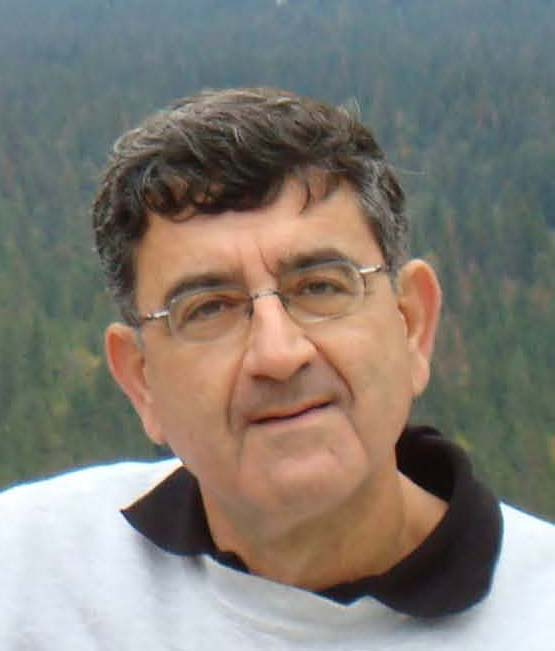
- Born: 29 November 1953 (age 72); Jerusalem, Israel
- Education: Hebrew University of Jerusalem (BSc); Tel-Aviv University (MSc); University of California, Berkeley (PhD)
- Awards: Michael Landau Prize in Bioinformatics (2011); ISCB Fellow (2012); ACM Fellow (2012)
- Scientific career
- Fields: Bioinformatics; Design and analysis of algorithms Algorithmic graph theory
- Workplaces: Tel Aviv University; Blavatnik School of Computer Science
- Doctoral advisor: Richard M. Karp; Ilan Adler
- Website: www.cs.tau.ac.il/~rshamir/

Ron Shamir (Hebrew: רון שמיר; born 29 November 1953) is an Israeli professor of computer science known for his work in graph theory and in computational biology. He holds the Raymond and Beverly Sackler Chair in Bioinformatics, and is the founder and former head of the Edmond J. Safra Center for Bioinformatics at Tel Aviv University.

== Biography ==
Ron Shamir was born in Jerusalem, Israel, in 1953, the eldest son of Varda and Raphael Shamir. His father's Sepharadic family has lived in the old city of Jerusalem for more than 400 years. His mother's parents were pioneers who came from Russia to Israel in the Third Aliyah in the early 1920s. He has two younger sisters, Daphna and Gadit.

Shamir studied in Gymnasia Rehavia, Jerusalem, for 12 years. In high school, he was active in the scouts and in athletics; among other accomplishments, he won the Jerusalem high school championship in shot put.

Shamir started his B.Sc. studies in mathematics and physics at Tel-Aviv University (1973–1975) and completed his degree at the Hebrew University of Jerusalem (1975–1977). He later began M.Sc. studies in operations research at Tel-Aviv University under the supervision of Uri Yechiali, and then joined the PhD program at the IEOR department of UC Berkeley, where he studied from 1981 to 1984. His PhD thesis was conducted under the supervision of Richard Karp and Ilan Adler.

== Research ==
=== Early years ===
Shamir started his research career in operations research, studying optimization problems related to linear programming and to the simplex method. His PhD thesis with Adler and Karp dealt with average case analysis of the Simplex Method, and showed that a certain Simplex variant was quadratic under a simple input data model. Similar results were given at the same time by Michael Todd and by Adler and Nimrod Megiddo. He later worked with Dorit S. Hochbaum on efficient algorithms for structured optimization problems.

=== Algorithmic Graph Theory ===
In the early 1990s, Shamir turned his focus to algorithmic graph theory. Together with his student, Haim Kaplan, and Martin Golumbic, he studied graph sandwich problems, graph completion problems and a variety of problems related to interval graphs. One of his papers on the interval satisfiability problem was later applied to the study of DNA physical mapping; this marked his introduction to the field of computational biology.

=== Bioinformatics ===
Shamir used his expertise in graph theory to develop clustering algorithms for analyzing gene expression problems. His first paper in this area, with Erez Hartuv, introduced the HCS clustering algorithm. His CAST algorithm, with Zohar Yakhini and Amir Ben-Dor was published in 1999 and drew a lot of attention from the bioinformatics community; the techniques described in the paper became popular for analyzing genomic data. The CLICK clustering algorithm with Roded Sharan and the SAMBA algorithm with Amos Tanay and Roded Sharan for biclustering are in broad use.

Shamir broadened his research to include additional aspects of bioinformatics, such as analysis of biological networks, genome rearrangements, sequence motif finding, and transcriptional regulation. Many tools developed in his laboratory are available as a part of the EXPANDER suite, which provides an integrated environment for analyzing high-throughput biological data.

Shamir's current research focuses on integrative analysis of heterogeneous high-throughput bio-medical data, genome rearrangements in cancer, and gene regulation.

=== SPIKE ===
SPIKE (Signaling Pathways Integrated Knowledge Engine) is a database of highly curated interactions for particular human pathways. SPIKE was developed by Shamir's computational biology group in cooperation with the group of Yosef Shiloh, an Israel Prize recipient for his research in systems biology, and the group of Karen Avraham, a leading researcher of human deafness, all from Tel Aviv University.

=== Additional activities ===
Shamir was on the founding steering committee of the RECOMB meeting, the premier theoretical conference in bioinformatics, and served on it for thirteen years. He co-founded the Israeli Society of Bioinformatics and Computational Biology, and was society president from 2004 to 2006. He is the head of the Edmond J. Safra Center for Bioinformatics at Tel-Aviv University and holds the Raymond and Beverly Sackler Chair in Bioinformatics. Shamir also devotes time to bioinformatics education. He developed extensive lecture notes which are in broad use on Computational Genomics (Algorithms for Molecular Biology) and on Analysis of Gene Expression, DNA Chips and Gene Networks. He established the joint Life Sciences / Computer Science undergraduate degree program in bioinformatics at Tel Aviv University; he teaches the program's core courses and has supervised many M.Sc. and Ph.D. students. He also co-edited the book "Bioinformatics for Biologists" with Pavel A. Pevzner.

Students

Shamir has mentored more than 80 graduate students and postdocs, many of whom developed impressive careers in academia and the industry. Among his students in academia are Haim Kaplan, Dekel Tsur, Dalit Naor, Itsik Pe'er, Roded Sharan, Amos Tanay, Adi Akavia, Reut Shalgi, Rani Elkon, Rotem Sorek, Irit Gat-Viks, Michal Ziv-Ukelson, Igor Ulitsky, Mukul Bansal, Meirav Zehavi, Yaron Orenstein, Adi Maron-Katz and Lianrong Pu.

== Awards and honors ==
- Accomplishments by a Senior Scientist Award, the International Society for Computational Biology (2022)
- Kadar Family Prize for outstanding research, Tel Aviv University (2017)
- RECOMB "Test of Time Award" for the 2004 paper ""Identification of protein complexes" (2016)
- Elected ISCB Fellow by the International Society for Computational Biology (2012)
- Elected ACM Fellow by the Association for Computing Machinery (2012)
- RECOMB "Test of Time Award" for his 1999 paper "Clustering gene expression patterns" (2011)
- The Michael Landau National Prize in the Sciences in Bioinformatics (2010)
- The Raymond and Beverly Sackler Chair in Bioinformatics, Tel Aviv University (2003)
- ISMB Best Paper Award for his paper "Spectrum Alignment" (2000)
- Alon Fellowship from the Israel Academy of Sciences and Humanities (1987)

== Personal life ==
Shamir is married to Michal Oren-Shamir. They have three sons: Alon, Ittai and Yoav. They live in Rehovot, Israel.
