= Canopy clustering algorithm =

The canopy clustering algorithm is an unsupervised pre-clustering algorithm introduced by Andrew McCallum, Kamal Nigam and Lyle Ungar in 2000. It is often used as preprocessing step for the K-means algorithm or the hierarchical clustering algorithm. It is intended to speed up clustering operations on large data sets, where using another algorithm directly may be impractical due to the size of the data set.

== Description ==
The algorithm proceeds as follows, using two thresholds $T_1$ (the loose distance) and $T_2$ (the tight distance), where $T_1 > T_2$ .

1. Begin with the set of data points to be clustered.
2. Remove a point from the set, beginning a new 'canopy' containing this point.
3. For each point left in the set, assign it to the new canopy if its distance to the first point of the canopy is less than the loose distance $T_1$.
4. If the distance of the point is additionally less than the tight distance $T_2$, remove it from the original set.
5. Repeat from step 2 until there are no more data points in the set to cluster.
6. These relatively cheaply clustered canopies can be sub-clustered using a more expensive but accurate algorithm.

An important note is that individual data points may be part of several canopies. As an additional speed-up, an approximate and fast distance metric can be used for 3, where a more accurate and slow distance metric can be used for step 4.

== Applicability ==
Since the algorithm uses distance functions and requires the specification of distance thresholds, its applicability for high-dimensional data is limited by the curse of dimensionality. Only when a cheap and approximative – low-dimensional – distance function is available, the produced canopies will preserve the clusters produced by K-means.

Its benefits include:

- The number of instances of training data that must be compared at each step is reduced.
- There is some evidence that the resulting clusters are improved.
