= SPIKE (database) =

Computational biology database

Content
- Description: highly curated human signaling pathways.
- Organisms: Homo sapiens

Contact
- Research center: Sackler School of Medicine, Tel Aviv University, Israel.
- Laboratory: Department of Human Molecular Genetics and Biochemistry,
- Authors: Arnon Paz
- Primary citation: Paz & al. (2011)
- Release date: 2010

Access
- Website: http://www.cs.tau.ac.il/~spike/
- Download URL: http://www.cs.tau.ac.il/~spike/formats.html

SPIKE (Signaling Pathways Integrated Knowledge Engine) is a database of highly curated interactions for particular human pathways.

== Development ==
SPIKE was developed by Ron Shamir's computational biology group in cooperation with the group of Yosef Shiloh, an Israel Prize recipient for his research in systems biology, and the group of Karen Avraham, a leading researcher of human deafness, all from Tel Aviv University.

== See also ==
- Signaling pathways
