= Hopkins statistic =

The Hopkins statistic (introduced by Brian Hopkins and John Gordon Skellam) is a way of measuring the cluster tendency of a data set. It belongs to the family of sparse sampling tests. It acts as a statistical hypothesis test where the null hypothesis is that the data is generated by a Poisson point process and are thus uniformly randomly distributed. If individuals are aggregated, then its value approaches 1, and if they are randomly distributed along the value tends to 0.5.

== Preliminaries ==
A typical formulation of the Hopkins statistic follows.

Let $X$ be the set of $n$ data points.
Generate a random sample $\overset{\sim}{X}$ of $m \ll n$ data points sampled without replacement from $X$.
Generate a set $Y$ of $m$ uniformly randomly distributed data points.
Define two distance measures,

$u_i,$ the minimum distance (given some suitable metric) of $y_i \in Y$ to its nearest neighbour in $X$, and
$w_i,$ the minimum distance of $\overset{\sim}{x}_i \in \overset{\sim}{X}\subseteq X$ to its nearest neighbour $x_j \in X,\, \overset{\sim}{x_i}\ne x_j.$

== Definition ==
With the above notation, if the data is $d$ dimensional, then the Hopkins statistic is defined as:

$H=\frac{\sum_{i=1}^m{u_i^d}}{\sum_{i=1}^m{u_i^d}+\sum_{i=1}^m{w_i^d}} \,$

Under the null hypotheses, this statistic has a Beta(m,m) distribution.

== Usage ==
Inconsistency in the definition and usage of the Hopkins statistic in both the scientific literature and statistical software has been pointed out. In two dimensions, the Hopkins statistic has been used to quantify regularity in the spatial distribution of objects as diverse as beech trees and semiconductor quantum dots.
