= Karen Avraham =

Israeli geneticist

Prof. Karen B. Avraham
- קרן אברהם
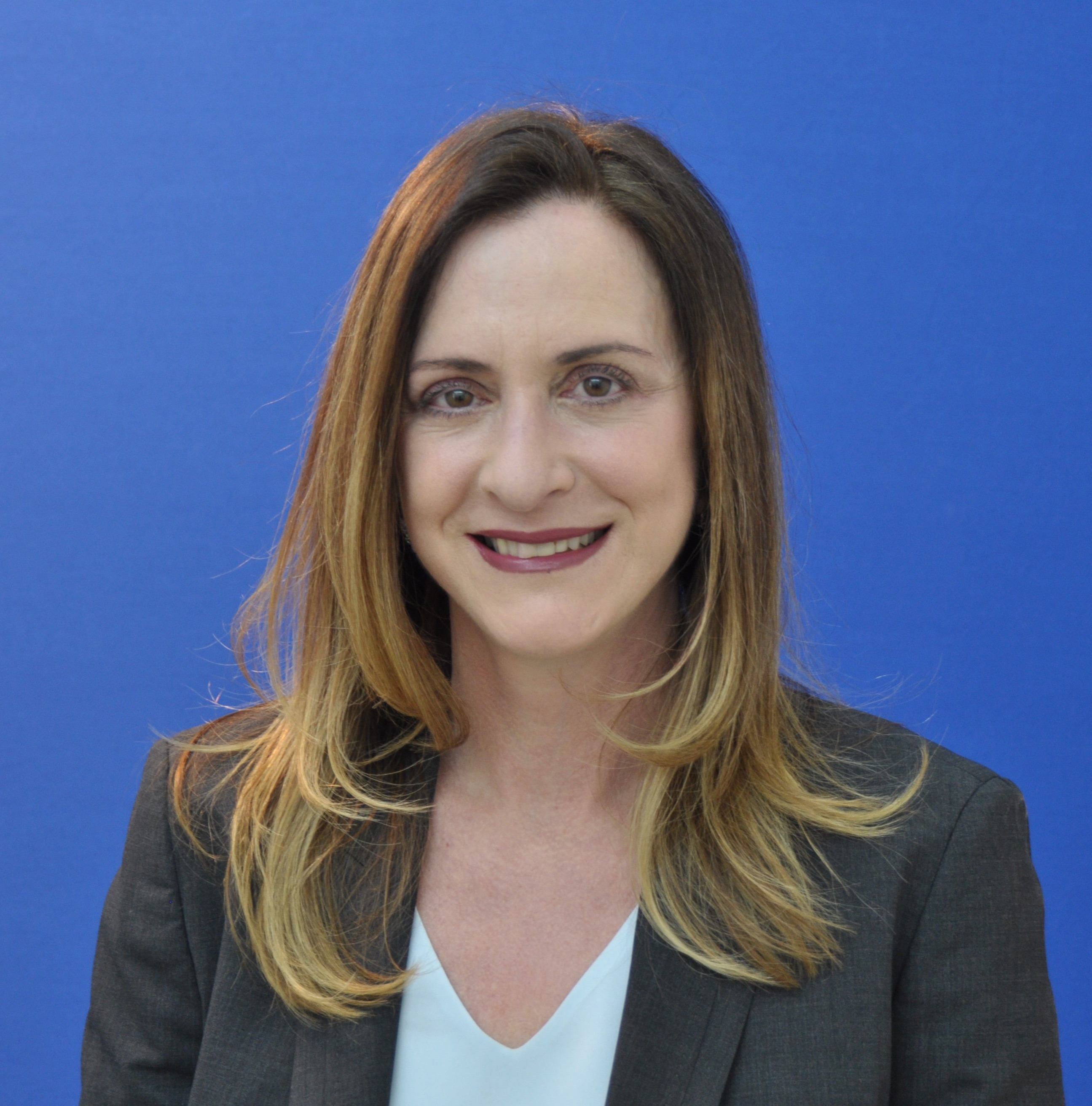
- Born: 1962 (age 63–64); Quebec, Canada
- Education: Washington University in St. Louis; Weizmann Institute
- Known for: Human Genetics, Deafness, Israeli-Palestinian Scientific Cooperation
- Scientific career
- Fields: Genetics, Hearing Impairment
- Workplaces: Tel Aviv University

Karen B. Avraham (Hebrew: קרן אברהם) is an Israeli-American human geneticist and the first female Dean of Gray Faculty of Medical and Health Sciences at Tel Aviv University. Born in Canada in 1962, Avraham moved to the US at a young age. Her research focuses on the discovery and characterization of genes responsible for hereditary hearing loss.

== Education ==
Avraham received her B.A. degree in Biology from Washington University in St. Louis and her Ph.D. from the Weizmann Institute of Science, under the supervision of Yoram Groner, and post-doctoral training at the National Cancer Institute, under the supervision of Nancy Jenkins and Neal Copeland.

== Career ==
As a full professor at Tel Aviv University, and the current dean of the Gray Faculty of Medical and Health Sciences, Avraham has a laboratory in the Department of Human Molecular Genetics and Biochemistry and holds the Drs Sarah and Felix Dumont Chair for Research of Hearing Disorders. Currently resides as the president of the Israel Society for Auditory Research (ISAR), Avraham held presidency with the Federation of Israel Societies for Experimental Biology (FISEB/ILANIT, 2017) as well a former board membership of the I-CORE: Gene Regulation in Complex Human Disease. Avraham is a council member of the European Molecular Biology Organization (EMBO, 2017), chair of the Scientific Committee of the Fondation pour l'audition in France, council member of the Human Genome Organization (HUGO, 2017), an elected member of the International Collegium Oto-Rhino-Laryngologicum Amicitiae Sacrum (CORLAS), and past president of the Association for Research in Otolaryngology (ARO) and the Genetic Society of Israel (GSI). She is an editor of Mammalian Genome (2017), section editor of the European Journal of Human Genetics (2017), associate editor of Human Genomics, and on the advisory editorial board of EMBO Molecular Medicine.

Avraham's research has centered on the discovery of disease genes, focusing on hereditary hearing loss. Her team studies the molecular basis of hearing loss using genetic, developmental, biochemical, cellular and bioinformatic tools. She leads the effort in exome sequencing for the discovery of disease genes to identify mutations that are relevant for the hearing-impaired population. Her group has demonstrated that microRNAs are essential for development and function of inner ear hair cells in vertebrates and has characterized the first long non-coding RNAs (lncRNAs) and methylation in the auditory system.

Avraham has supervised more than 130 students through their M.Sc. or Ph.D. training, students, physicians and post docs have trained in her lab. She has published extensively in peer-reviewed journals, with an H-index of 48, and written reviews and book chapters.

=== SPIKE ===
SPIKE (Signaling Pathways Integrated Knowledge Engine) is a database of highly curated interactions for particular human pathways. SPIKE was developed by Avraham, Ron Shamir's computational biology group, and Yosef Shiloh, an Israel Prize recipient for his research in systems biology, all from Tel Aviv University.

=== Awards and funding ===
Avraham has been awarded the Sir Bernard Katz Prize from the Alexander-von Humboldt Foundation (Germany), the Bruno Memorial Prize from the Rothschild Foundation. the Teva Prize for Groundbreaking Research in Field of Rare Diseases from Teva Pharmaceuticals (Israel) and the Teva Founders Prize on Breakthroughs (Israel).

Funding in her laboratory includes from the National Institutes of Health, European Commission, Human Frontiers, I-CORE, Israel Science Foundation and the US-Israel Binational Science Foundation.

=== Papers ===
- Positional-Candidate Cloning of Genes from Mouse Mutants, Karen B. Avraham, Gene knockout protocols, Martin J. Tymms; Ismail Kola (eds.). John M. Walker (series ed.), Methods in molecular biology series, 158. Humana Press, c2001. ISBN 0896035727LCCN 00-50603
- Avraham, Karen B.; Hasson, Tama. Genes and mutations in hearing impairment, Genetics and auditory disorders. Keats, Bronya J. B.; Popper, Arthur N.; Fay, Richard R.(eds.), Springer handbook of auditory research, 14, Springer, c2002.ISBN 0387985018
- Hertzano, Ronna; Avraham, Karen B. POU-Domain transcription factors, Genetic hearing loss. Patrick J. Willems (ed), Marcel Dekker, c2004. LCCN 2003-62467
- Positional-Candidate Cloning of Genes from Mouse Mutants, Gene knockout protocols, Martin J. Tymms and Ismail Kola (eds.). John M. Walker (series editor), Methods in molecular biology series 158. Humana Press, c2010. LCCN 00-50603
- 2. Molecular Etiology of Deafness and Cochlear Consequences, Brownstein, Zippora; Shivatzki, Shaked; Avraham, Karen B., Deafness, Kral, Andrej; Popper, Arthur N.; Fay, Richard R. (eds).Springer handbook of auditory research, 47. Springer, c2013. LCCN 2013-944528
