= G-measure =

Mathematical measure

In mathematics, a G-measure is a measure $\mu$ that can be represented as the weak-∗ limit of a sequence of measurable functions $G = \left(G_n\right)_{n=1}^\infty$. A classic example is the Riesz product

$$G_n(t) = \prod_{k=1}^n \left( 1 + r \cos(2 \pi m^k t) \right)$$

where $-1 < r < 1, m \in \mathbb N$. The weak-∗ limit of this product is a measure on the circle $\mathbb T$, in the sense that for $f \in C(\mathbb T)$:

$$\int f \, d\mu = \lim_{n\to\infty} \int f(t) \prod_{k=1}^n \left( 1 + r \cos(2 \pi m^k t)\right) \, dt = \lim_{n\to\infty} \int f(t) G_n(t) \, dt$$

where $dt$ represents Haar measure.

== History ==
It was Keane who first showed that Riesz products can be regarded as strong mixing invariant measure under the shift operator $S(x) = mx\, \bmod\, 1$. These were later generalized by Brown and Dooley to Riesz products of the form

$$\prod_{k=1}^\infty \left( 1 + r_k \cos(2 \pi m_1m_2\cdots m_k t) \right)$$

where $-1 < r_k < 1, m_k \in \mathbb N, m_k \geq 3$.
