= VASCAR =

Device measuring the speed of a moving vehicle

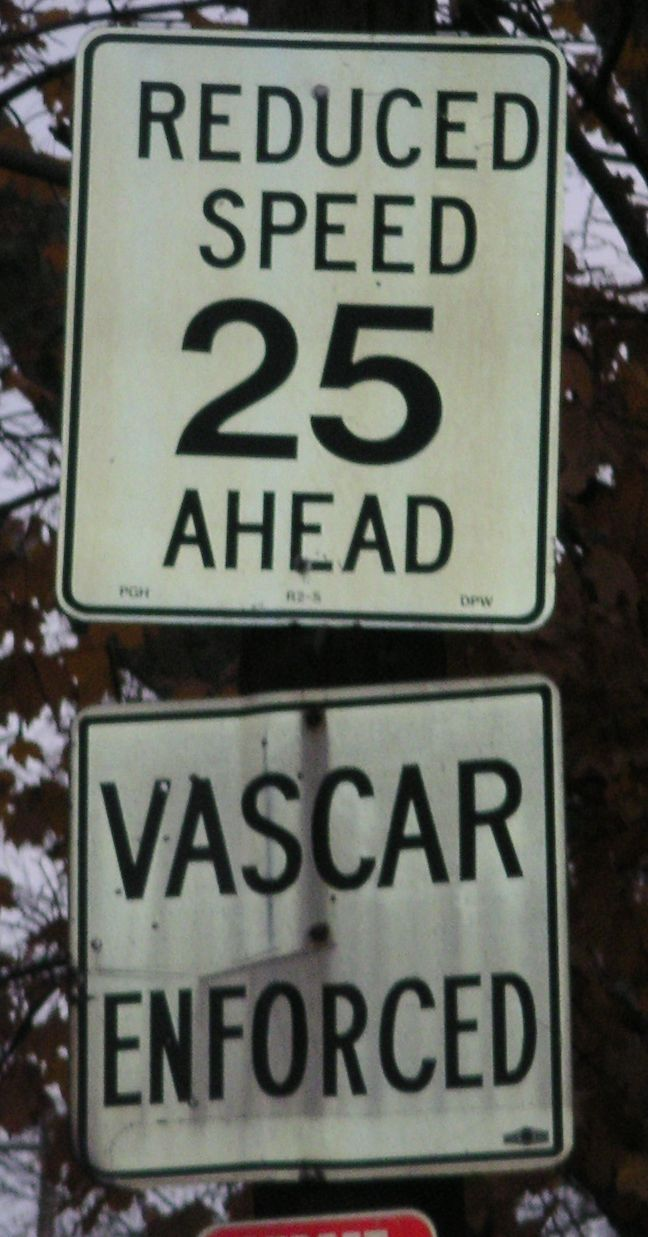
Street sign showing where speed is enforced by VASCAR.

VASCAR (Visual Average Speed Computer And Recorder) is a type of device for calculating the speed of a moving vehicle. The first VASCAR device was created in 1966 by Arthur Marshall. It is used by police officers to enforce speed limits, and may be preferred where radar or LIDAR is illegal, such as in some jurisdictions in Pennsylvania, or to prevent detection by those with radar detectors.

== Operation ==
A VASCAR unit uses a stopwatch and a simple computer. An operator records the moments that a vehicle passes two fixed objects (such as a white circle or square painted on the road) that are a known distance apart. The vehicle's average speed is then calculated by dividing the distance between the points by the time taken to travel between them. The mean value theorem implies that at some time between the measurements the vehicle's speed must be equal to its average speed.

VASCAR can be used from a moving or stationary vehicle or helicopter or other aerial platform. The target vehicle may be travelling in any direction, in front of or behind or below the observer.

A 1991 study by the National Highway Traffic Safety Administration found that VASCAR-plus units produced errors of less than 2 mph if used correctly.

If VASCAR is used incorrectly, any operator can easily falsify a reading.

== Users ==
VASCAR is known to be used where radar or LIDAR is illegal, such as in some jurisdictions in Pennsylvania. Many police vehicles in the United Kingdom are fitted with a device, especially those used for traffic enforcement. The system is also used by airborne units — in some remote locations of the United States, airborne speed enforcement is employed regularly.

== History ==
VASCAR was invented by Arthur Marshall, a real estate investor living in Richmond, Virginia in 1966. He was inspired to create the device after watching a police car driving dangerously trying to pace a speeder. The original version of the device was entirely mechanical, using a governed motor and a gear system to move a pointer to the correct speed value. Subsequent versions used a microprocessor to perform the speed calculations. By 1968, the device was in use in North Carolina, Indiana, Kentucky, and New York. In 1971, Marshall formed a company, Traffic Safety Systems, Inc., to market the device. After his death, Traffic Safety Systems was purchased by Power Systems & Controls, Inc., which had long manufactured the devices. They continue to produce similar devices under the name VASCAR-plus.

== Technical details ==
VASCAR relies on the accuracy of the patrol vehicle's speedometer drive (generally located within the vehicle transmission) for determining the distance traveled, using an odometer within the VASCAR system itself. Recently purchased law enforcement vehicles generally have electronic speedometers, and a sensor wire is connected to the speed-sensor feed wire to count the pulses from the drive. Older vehicles, with cable-driven speedometers, are connected to the VASCAR unit with a mechanical-optical adapter that attaches to the cable. Pulses are counted the same way for both input methods.

The time and distance registers are completely separate from each other, and each is controlled by a toggle switch operated by the traffic officer. To clock the patrol vehicle's speed (for instance, when the speed is matched with the violator's vehicle), both switches are operated simultaneously. Most often, however, the TIME toggle is activated when the violator's vehicle passes an identifiable landmark (such as a signpost), and the DISTANCE toggle is activated when the patrol vehicle passes the same landmark. When the violator passes a second landmark, the timer is stopped, and when the patrol vehicle passes that landmark, the distance measurement stops. These two values are then compared by the digital computer, which displays the average speed over that distance.

Early VASCAR units were made up of three parts. The main computer section was a box that was installed in a trunk or under a seat, the odometer drive was installed under the vehicle dashboard, and the control unit was mounted in a convenient operating location. Later systems combined the control and computer sections into a single unit and replaced the earlier Nixie tube displays with LEDs.

Some VASCAR systems have included the ability to set a specific distance, allowing a traffic officer to avoid having to measure each time that stretch of road was checked. It is also possible to retain an earlier measurement, to be used with multiple vehicles (for instance, when spending a morning enforcing speed in a school zone). Until a new distance is put into the system memory, all speeds will be calculated based on the previous distance information.

== Strengths and weaknesses of VASCAR ==
The VASCAR system has one major advantage over the RADAR and LIDAR systems also used for determining speed, in that it is not necessary to be in (or close to) the line of travel of the target vehicle. RADAR and LIDAR clock speed using the Doppler effect, so a vehicle traveling at an angle in relation to the unit will have a lower speed reading than the actual speed. VASCAR, however, can provide an accurate speed clock under any conditions in which both a start and a stop point can be identified. It is not even necessary to see the entire course over which the target vehicle travels so long as that specific vehicle can be identified as it passes the start and end points. The greater the distance (to the limit of the device), the more accurate the average speed.

The primary weakness of VASCAR is that it can be easily falsified.

A second weakness is that it can only provide an average speed, in contrast to the near-instant speed readout of a Doppler effect system. Thus, it is possible for a vehicle to be well above the speed limit, then slow to the same amount below the limit for the same period, and have a legal speed.

A third weakness is that the operator must be able to visually identify the target vehicle and both start and end points as well as operate the switches at the precise moments necessary.

== Similar devices ==
While the name VASCAR is no longer trademarked, VASCAR and VASCAR V PLUS are trademarked in South Africa by Signal Systems (Pty) Limited. Power Systems & Controls holds the trademark to VASCAR-plus. Other companies sell similar, though non-VASCAR-branded, systems. For example, under the category "electronic speed timing devices (nonradar), which calculate average speed between any two points", the Pennsylvania Department of Transportation authorizes two devices in addition to the various VASCAR-plus models: the Tracker, by PATCO, and the V-SPEC, by YIS/Cowden Group.

== See also ==
- Automatic number plate recognition
- SPECS (speed camera)
- Video detection and ranging
