= Georgios Magklaras =

Georgios (George) V. Magklaras (born in Agrinio, Greece) (Greek: Γεώργιος Μαγκλάρας) is a computer scientist working as a Senior Computer Systems Engineer at the Norwegian Meteorological Institute, in Norway. He also co-founded Steelcyber Scientific, an information security based consultancy specialising in digital forensics. He is a high-performance computing engineer and information security researcher. He developed methods in the field of insider IT misuse detection and prediction and digital forensics. He is the author of the LUARM and POFR tools for the Linux Operating System. He has been a strong advocate of Linux, open source tools and the Perl programming language and has given a series of lectures internationally in the fields of intrusion detection systems, digital forensics, bioinformatics, computer programming and systems administration.

== Education ==
Magklaras gained his BSc (Hons) in Computer Systems and Networks from the University of Plymouth, UK, where he graduated in 2000. He was then awarded an EPSRC scholarship to start the study of an MPhil (2005) degree in the area of Information Security, under the Faculty of Technology at the University of Plymouth, UK. Under the supervision of Prof. Steven M. Furnell at the School of Computing, University of Plymouth, UK], he completed his PhD study in the same area (Information Security) in 2012.

== Research and career ==
His research was initially concerned with ways to classify computer security incident management responses. However, his attention was drawn to the problem of misuse detection. Magklaras developed one of the first methods to systematize the misuse detection and misuse prediction techniques. He captured the problem of insider IT misuse and set the theoretical and practical foundations for a generic architecture that facilitates misuse detection and misuse prediction. As part of this work, he wrote the LUARM tool which is a live/volatile digital forensics engine that targets misuse detection. The LUARM research prototype has already been used with success on a number of notable cases detecting insiders and external computer intrusion attempts, however its main usefulness as a research prototype is to create data sets for researchers to further understand the nature of insider threats. An evolved open source version of the tool, the Penguin OS Forensic Recorder POFR has been developed under his supervision by Steelcyber Scientific, an IT consulting firm that focuses on information security and scientific computing. This version contains performance, security and forensic data accuracy improvements over the originally developed LUARM prototype and is suitable for auditing various IT infrastructure components.

Magklaras also pioneered the use of Domain Specific Languages in the field of misuse detection and prediction, in order to strengthen the data mining capabilities of information security researchers. His work on the Insider Threat Prediction and Specification Language (ITPSL) forms the only known XML based DSL language that attempts to produce semantics capable of combining techniques that mine and interpret misuse data with tags that provide the likelihood of a misuse threat occurring.

Magklaras has also been involved in the construction of deep packet inspection infrastructures for several hardware/software vendors, although this work has not been presented on the public domain. He is a strong advocate of information privacy. He has performed security assessments of COVID-19 mobile phone contact tracing applications. However, he has expressed critical views on how the mass media are covering the issue of electronic surveillance and has consulted for the Free Software Foundation on that matter. He has been an infrequent contributor of Black Hat Briefings and has participated (as part of a team) in various computer hacking challenges, including that of the GCHQ challenge in 2011.

In the field of bioinformatics, Magklaras has contributed to the study of biological sequence databases and protein-to-protein interactions by mainly engineering software (algorithms, programming) to address these tasks. His is also known for his technical work in architectures that address the data storage volume and processing requirements of Next Generation Sequencing machines.

Prior to working at the Norwegian Meteorological Institute, Magklaras has worked in various technical and scientific positions for a number of companies and organisations, including those of the University of Oslo, Sequent Computer Systems, IBM UK and Tiscali. He has held a number of professional affiliations, including those of an IEEE affiliate member, USENIX, SAGE/LOPSA and Red Hat Certified Engineer. He has held the position of Secretary (since 2005) and Chair (2010–2015) of the Technical Management Project Committee of the EMBnet organization.
