= Video detection and ranging =

Technique to measure the speed or other information of a distant vehicle

Video detection and ranging (VIDAR) is a technique to measure the speed or other information of a distant vehicle using advanced stereoscopic imaging techniques. VIDAR technology has application in remote sensing, traffic enforcement.

== Applications ==
Military and law enforcement

One situation where VIDAR has notable non-scientific application is in traffic speed enforcement, for vehicle speed measurement, as a technology alternative to radar guns and LIDAR. The technology for this application can be mounted in a gantry or roadside pole.

Unlike RADAR which relies on doppler shifts to directly measure speed or LIDAR which relies on the principle of time-of-flight to calculate speed, VIDAR measures the speed of vehicles by means of tracking an object through vision cameras. High precision speed measurement can be achieved if stereoscopic vision techniques are used.

== See also ==
- LIDAR detector
- Radar
- ANPR
- Stereoscopy
- VASCAR
