= Radar detector =

Electronic device

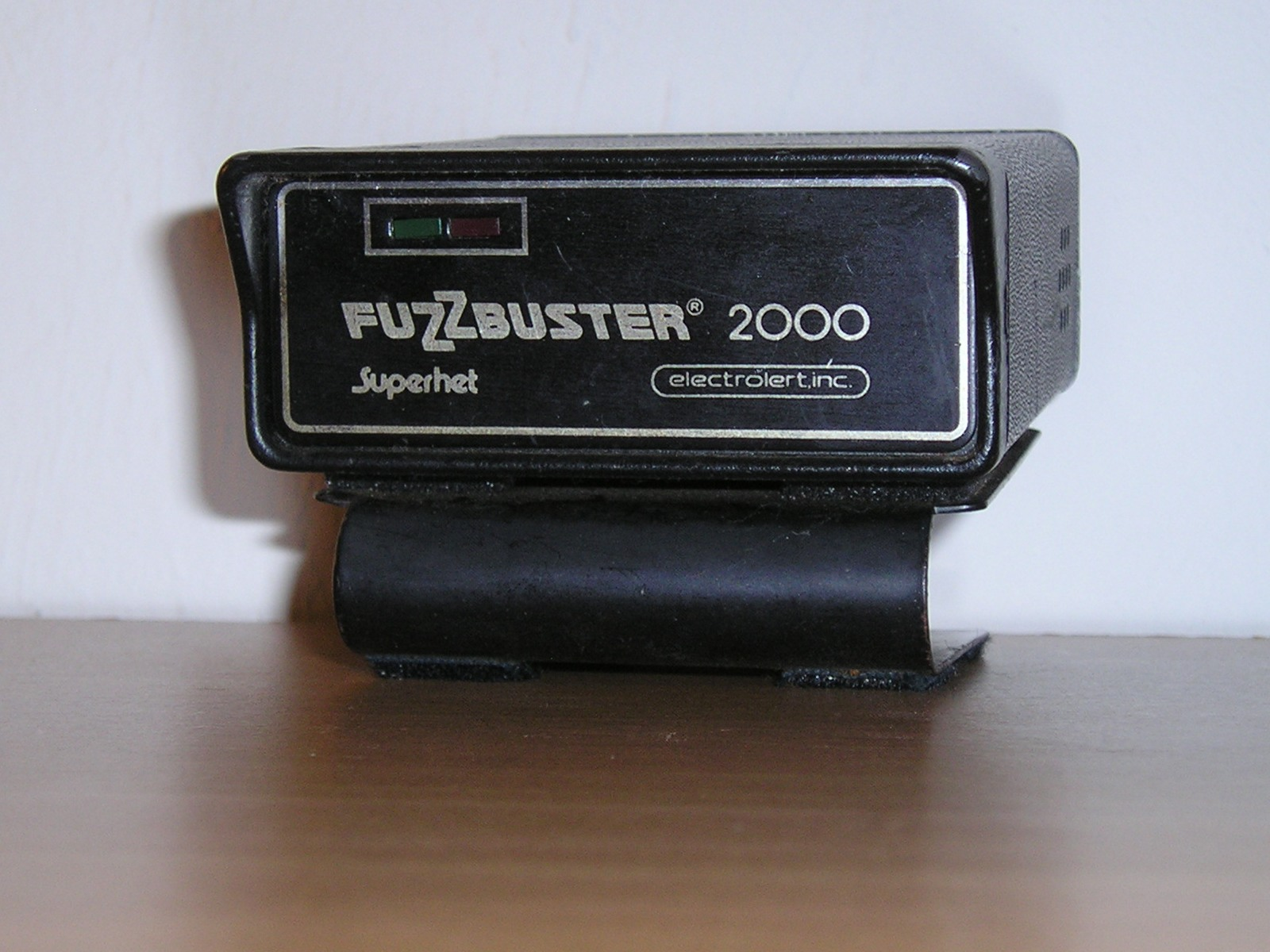
An early radar detector

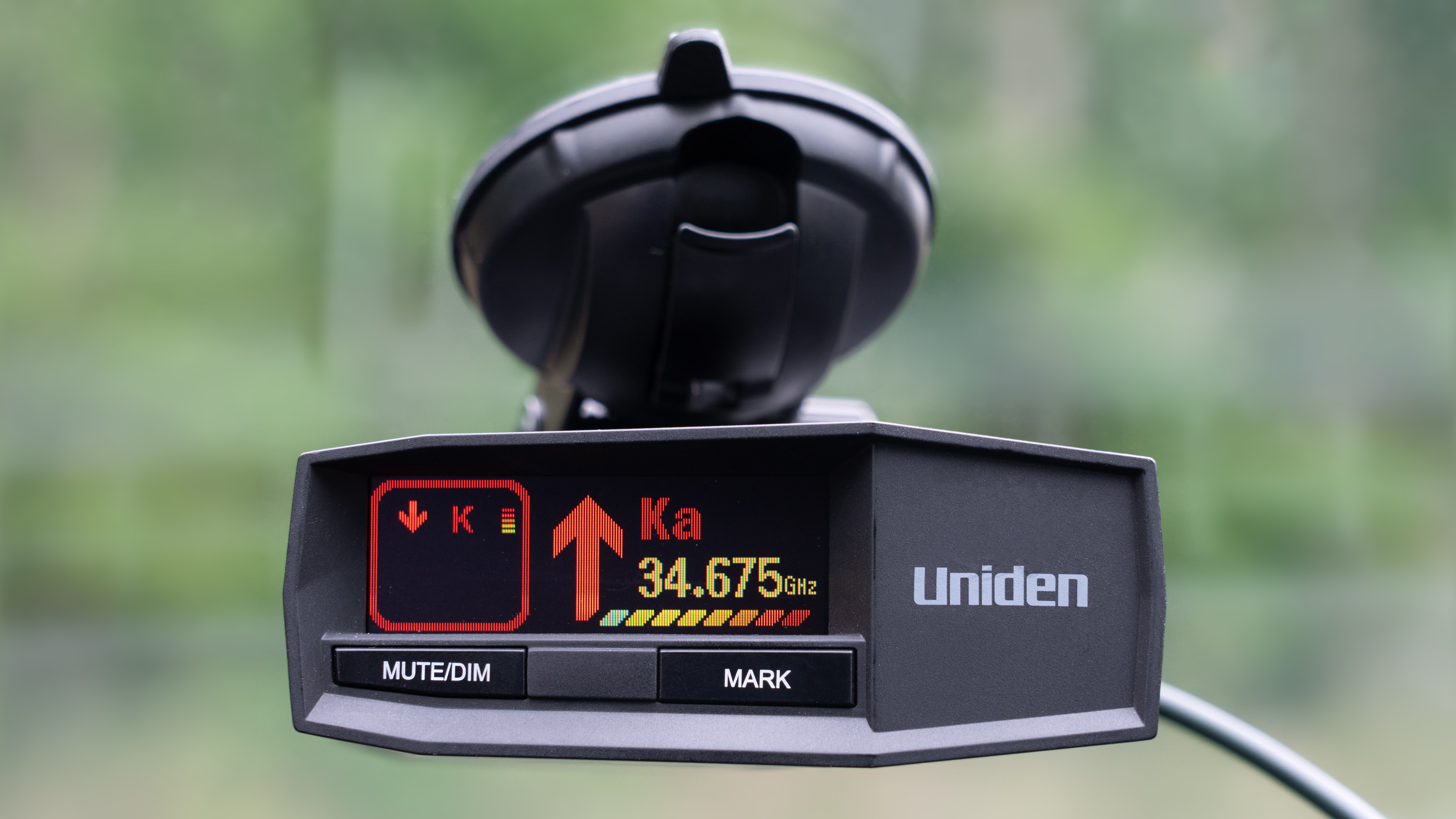
A modern radar detector

A radar detector is an electronic device used by motorists intended to detect the presence of nearby radar guns operated by law enforcement that measure vehicle speeds. Most radar detectors are intended to give motorists advanced warning of upcoming radar guns in order to reduce their speed before being cited. In general sense, only emitting technologies, like doppler RADAR, or LIDAR can be detected. Visual speed estimating techniques, like VASCAR can not be detected in daytime, but technically vulnerable to detection at night, when IR spotlight is used. There are no reports that piezo sensors can be detected. LIDAR devices require an optical-band sensor, although many modern detectors include LIDAR sensors. Most of today's radar detectors detect signals across a variety of wavelength bands: usually X, K, and K_{a}. In Europe the K_{u} band is common as well. The success of radar detectors is based on the fact that radio-wave beams can not be narrow-enough, so the detector usually senses stray and scattered radiation, giving the driver time to slow down. Based on a focused laser-beam, LIDAR technology does not suffer this shortcoming; however it requires precise aiming while stationary.

== Description ==
One device law enforcement use to measure the expected speed of a moving vehicle is Doppler radar, which uses the Doppler effect to measure the relative speed of a vehicle. Doppler radar works by beaming a radio wave at a vehicle to then measure the expected change in frequency of the reflected wave (that bounces off the vehicle). Law enforcement often employs Doppler radar via hand-held radar guns, from vehicles, or from fixed objects such as traffic signals.

Radar detectors use a superheterodyne receiver to detect these electromagnetic emissions from the gun, and raise an alarm to notify the motorist when a transmission is detected. False alarms can occur however due to the large number of devices, such as automatic door openers (such as the ones at supermarkets and drug stores), speed signs, blind spot monitoring systems, poorly designed radar detectors and adaptive cruise control, that operate in the same part of the electromagnetic spectrum as radar guns.

Most modern radar detectors include GPS technology. This allows users to manually store the locations where police frequently monitor traffic, with the detector sounding an alarm when approaching that location in the future (this is accomplished by pushing a button and does not require coordinates to be entered). These detectors also allow users to manually or automatically store the coordinates of sites of frequent false alarms, which the GPS enabled detector will then ignore. The detector can also be programmed to mute alerts when traveling below a preset speed, which reduces unnecessary alerts from stationary sources such as automatic door openers at shopping centers and roadside speed display signs that are more commonly encountered at low speeds. Some GPS enabled detectors can download the GPS coordinates of speed monitoring cameras and red-light cameras from the Internet, alerting the driver that they are approaching the camera.

== Counter technology ==
Radar guns and detectors have each evolved in a technological arms race to counter each other's technology. For example, as new frequencies have been introduced, radar detectors have initially been "blind" to them until their technology, too, has been updated. Similarly, the length of time and strength of the transmissions have been lowered to reduce the chance of detection, which in turn has resulted in more sensitive receivers and more sophisticated software counter technology. Lastly, radar detectors may combine other technologies, such as GPS-based technology with a point of interest database of known speed trapping locations, into a single device to improve their chances of success.

=== Radar detector detectors ===
The superheterodyne receiver in radar detectors has a local oscillator that radiates slightly, so it is possible to build a radar-detector detector, which detects such emissions (usually the frequency of the radar type being detected, plus about 10 MHz). The VG-2 Interceptor was the first device developed for this purpose, but has since been eclipsed by the Spectre III and Spectre Elite. The Spectre line was manufactured by Stealth Micro Systems Pty Ltd of Australia and distributed in the United States by Applied Concepts, Inc.; the company's website went offline by late 2020 and the Spectre line is no longer in production. This form of "electronic warfare" cuts both ways - since detector-detectors use a similar superheterodyne receiver, many early "stealth" radar detectors were equipped with a radar-detector-detector-detector circuit, which shuts down the main radar receiver when the detector-detector's signal is sensed, thus preventing detection by such equipment. This technique borrows from ELINT surveillance countermeasures. In the early 1990s, BEL-Tronics, Inc. of Ontario, Canada (where radar detector use is prohibited in most provinces) found that the local oscillator frequency of the detector could be altered to be out of the range of the VG-2 Interceptor (probably by using two local oscillator stages such that neither is near the RF frequency). This resulted in detector manufacturers responding by changing their local oscillator frequency. The VG-2 is no longer in production and radar detectors immune to the Spectre Elite are available.

=== Radar scrambling ===
It is illegal in many countries to sell or possess any products that actively transmit radar signals intended to jam radar equipment. In the United States, actively transmitting on a frequency licensed by the Federal Communications Commission (FCC) without a licence is a violation of FCC regulations, which may be punishable by fines up to $10,000 and/or up to one year imprisonment.

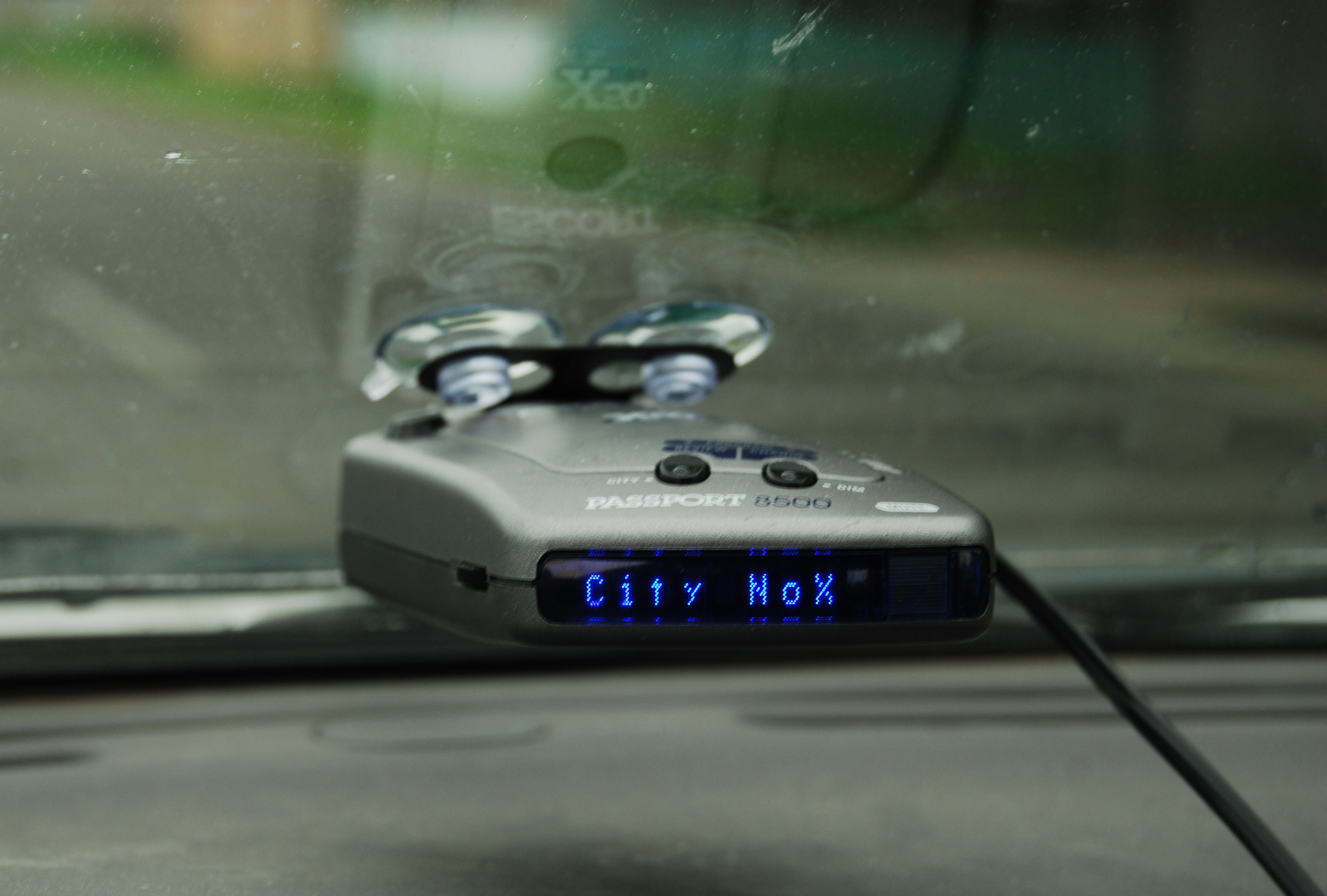
Passport x50 Radar/Laser detector.

== LIDAR detection ==
Legal status of radar detectors and jammers by country: Ownership and use illegal Use illegal, but ownership allowed Jammers prohibited, use of radar detectors allowed Use of jammers and radar detectors allowed

Newer speed detection devices use pulsed laser light, commonly referred to as LIDAR, rather than radio waves. Radar detectors, which detect radio transmissions, are unable to detect the infrared light emitted by LIDAR guns, so a different type of device called a LIDAR detector is required. However, LIDAR detection is not nearly as effective as radar detection because the output beam is very focused. While radar's radio waves can expand to 85 feet (26 m) across at 1,000 feet (300 m) from their source, LIDAR's light beam diffuses to only about 6 feet (1.8 m). A police officer targeting a car will most likely aim for the center mass or headlight of the vehicle and, because radar detectors are mounted on the windshield away from the beam's aim, they may not alert at all. With such a focused beam, an officer using a LIDAR gun can target a single car in close proximity to others at ranges of up to 9,500 feet (2,900 m). This has resulted in some manufacturers producing LIDAR jammers. Unlike those of radar, LIDAR's frequencies and use are not controlled by the FCC. These jammers attempt to confuse police LIDAR into showing no speed on the display. They are often successful, and therefore many LIDAR manufacturers produce LIDAR guns that have "jam codes" that show when they are being jammed. They work against some LIDAR jammers, but not all. In spite of this, police can sometimes tell when they are being jammed when they see no reading on their LIDAR gun. Many jammer-equipped motorists try to counter this by reducing their speed to legal limits before turning off their jammer equipment, a technique known as "kill the equipment", referred to as "JTK" or "Jam to Kill." Experienced officers can often detect this by observing that their LIDAR equipment is unable to lock in a speed properly, along with visual indication of sudden deceleration of the targeted vehicle. They may then pull the offending vehicle over and look for LIDAR jammers on the front of the vehicle, potentially ticketing the motorist with an obstruction of justice charge. Some states also have laws against jamming of police radar or LIDAR: California, Colorado, Illinois, Iowa, Minnesota, Oklahoma, South Carolina, Tennessee, Texas, Utah, and Virginia. In these states, the penalties can be severe.

Despite the advent of LIDAR speed detection, radar remains more prevalent because of its lower price and the amount of radar equipment already in service. In addition, proper use of LIDAR equipment requires the officer to remain stationary in order to beam a very precise signal.

== Legality ==
Using or possessing a radar detector or jammer is illegal in certain countries, and it may result in fines, seizure of the device, or both. These prohibitions generally are introduced under the premise that a driver who uses a radar detector will pose a greater risk of accident than a driver who does not. The table below provides information about laws regarding radar detectors in particular nations. In 1967 devices to warn drivers of radar speed traps were being manufactured in the United Kingdom; they were deemed illegal under the Wireless Telegraphy Act 1949.

Country	Legality	Comment	Radar Bands
Argentina	Detectors: legal; Jammers: illegal in CABA, Buenos Aires and San Juan	No nationwide ban on detectors. Reception of radio signals is allowed, except in the case of private correspondence. In CABA, Buenos Aires and San Juan fines are imposed for carrying anti-radar equipment. "Anti-radar" is defined as devices that deliberately evade speed controls (anti-radar jammers).	K, Ka, Laser, Gatso, Inductive Loop
Australia	Illegal in all states.	They are illegal to use in a moving vehicle (as stated by the traffic laws in) SA, NSW, ACT, NT, Queensland and Tasmania. In the state of Victoria it is an offence to sell, use or possess a radar detector, and police may confiscate such equipment if found in a vehicle. Heavy fines apply, ranging from AU$200–$1,700, up to nine demerit points, and confiscation of the radar detector. However, importing a unit is permitted under Australian customs regulations. Queensland = up to 40 penalty units (approximately equal to $3,000) for being in or on a vehicle whether or not the device is operating or in working order. Effective October 12, 2020, heavy penalties for drivers with radar detectors apply in WA.	K, Ka, Laser
Belgium	Illegal	In July 2006, a provisional seizure of a vehicle worth over €75,000 and destruction of the radar detector was ordered by the courts. The driver's licence was suspended for three months.	
Bosnia & Herzegovina	Illegal	Even G.P.S. based radar detectors are illegal. Fine between 100 & 300 BAM.	
Brazil	Illegal in all states.		
Bulgaria	Detectors legal, jammers illegal.	Radar jammers are illegal.	X, K (fixed camera+radar)
Canada	Legal in British Columbia, Alberta, and Saskatchewan.; Illegal in Newfoundland and Labrador, Nova Scotia, Prince Edward Island, New Brunswick, Quebec, Ontario, Manitoba, Yukon, Northwest Territories and Nunavut.	Regardless of whether they are used or not, police there may confiscate radar detectors, operational or not, and impose substantial fines in provinces where radar detectors are illegal. Quebec penalizes $500 CAD for use of a radar detector, along with confiscation of the device.	K, Ka, Laser
China	Detectors legal, jammers illegal	All radar locations in China are reported and published. Map apps on a phone will report the locations. But all speeding and traffic violation radar or camera are electronic police with a police number as well as a human being police. Using a jammer will be considered as obstructing a police and subject to 15 days imprisonment. Radar jammers are also illegal in Hong Kong and Macau.	
Croatia	Detectors and jammers are illegal to use or to have in a motor vehicle.	€270 fine if using a jammer. Only confiscation for a detector.	
Cuba	Illegal		
Czech Republic	Detectors legal (for example products of leading Czech company Genevo), jammers illegal.	Fine up to CZK 10,000 (€388)	Ka
Egypt	Detectors and jammers are illegal.		
Estonia	Illegal to use or have in a motor vehicle.	Fine up to €1150 as well as confiscation of the device.	
Finland	Illegal to use or have in a motor vehicle on a public road.	The fine depends on income. The detector will be confiscated. For average net income of €2200 /month, the fine would be around €640 plus possible speeding ticket.	Ka
France	Detectors and jammers are illegal to own, use or sell.	Regardless of whether they are used or not, police there may confiscate radar detectors, operational or not, and impose substantial fines. Since 2012, there are also very strict regulations regarding G.P.S. devices which locate speed cameras. Speed cameras must be signaled as "Danger zones" which are precisely 300 meters long in towns, 2 km out of towns and 4 km on highways. Use of illegal radar detector is prosecuted €1500 fine & 6 points on driver's license.	K 24.125 GHz, Laser
Germany	Legal to own, illegal to use in a moving vehicle	€75 fine, 4 Points, destruction of the radar detector.	
Greece	Illegal	€2000 fine, 30 day driver's license suspension, 60 days car registration license suspension and 5 SESO penalty points	
Honduras	Illegal	According to art. 98, clause 20, it is illegal and a major offence "To use vehicles with unauthorized devices or forbidden by Law, capable of letting users skip random checkpoints or disable police surveillance devices".	Laser
Hungary	Detectors: legal. Jammers: legal to own, illegal to use.		
India	Illegal		
Iceland	Legal	Radar jammers are illegal.	
Ireland	Illegal	Law Refers to 'Speed Meter Detectors', Introduced 1991. No fixed penalty for possession, expect confiscation and hefty fine.	
Israel	Detectors legal as of 2000. Jammers still illegal.	Some cellular providers such as Pelephone actually provide radar detecting as a service powered by GPS	Ka, Laser
Italy	Illegal	Fine up to €3312 as well as confiscation of the device.	
Japan	Legal		
Jordan	Illegal	Regardless of whether they are used or not, police there may confiscate radar detectors, operational or not.	Laser (possibly others)
Kazakhstan	Legal		X, K, Ka, X POP, Ka POP, Laser
Latvia	Legal to own, illegal to use in a vehicle	57 EUR fine and the detector will be confiscated.	K, POP Ka, Laser
Lithuania	Detectors: legal. Jammers: legal to own, illegal to use.		X, POP K, Laser
Malaysia	Illegal to possess, purchase, sell or use. Heavy fines apply.	Radar detectors are also prohibited items under customs laws.	
Mexico	Legal in most states	Forbidden in Mexico City (Distrito Federal), US$200 fine and impoundment of the vehicle.	
Netherlands	Illegal	€420 fine and seizure of the device (since 2004)	
New Zealand	Legal	Ka and Laser used also fixed speed camera and speed camera vans (Low Powered K Band)	
North Korea	Illegal	Confiscated in border controls along South Korea and China borders, and in airports.	
Norway	Illegal to use. (Legal to own, sell, and buy)	8000-10000 krone fine and seizure of the device.	
Pakistan	Legal		
Philippines	Legal		
Poland	Legal to own, illegal to use in a moving vehicle	Jammers illegal	X, K, Pulse K, Ka Narrow, Laser
Portugal	Illegal to own and/or use in a vehicle	Law enforcement authorities can confiscate radar detectors and apply a fine. The Portuguese Tax and Customs Authority can seize any imported radar detectors. Radar jammers are also illegal.	
Romania	Legal since 2006	Radar jammers still illegal.	Instant-On K, Laser
Russia	Detectors legal, jammers illegal.	The national system for measuring the speed of vehicles and cars. National ranges work radars in X and Ku.	Instant-On (Pulse) X(10,2-10,65 GHz), Ku(13,56-13,62 GHz) POP K, Laser (0,8-1,1 mkm)
Saudi Arabia	Illegal		
Serbia	Illegal to purchase, use, possess, sell or advertise	Illegal to use or have in possession in a vehicle in traffic, to sell or advertise: an apparatus or any other means of detecting or interfering with operation of vehicle speed measuring devices, or any other apparatus used for discovering and reporting traffic violations	
Singapore	Illegal to possess, purchase, sell or use. Heavy fines apply.	Radar detectors are also prohibited items under customs laws.	
Slovakia	Legal to own, illegal to use in a vehicle	In case of proven use, there is a fine of €150.	Ka, K, Laser
Slovenia	Legal	Laser jammers illegal (fine up to €500 and confiscation of the device).	
South Africa	Illegal to use in a moving vehicle	Importing a unit is permitted under South African customs regulations.	
South Korea	Illegal	Speed camera guidance, such as by GPS, is legal and common in South Korea. Interfering with speed camera is prohibited by Korea Road Traffic Act Article 46.2. And Jamming a police radio device is punishable by up to 10 years in prison under the Radio Act Article 82.	
Spain	Radar Detectors illegal, jammers illegal.	Radar and Laser jammers fine up to €6000. Radar detectors fine up to 3 points from the driving license and €200.	Ka narrow, laser, Autovelox
Switzerland	Detectors and jammers are illegal to own, use or sell.	660SFr fine. Radar detectors will be confiscated and destroyed. The use of any GPS-based device to locate speed cameras is also illegal.	K-Band 24.125 GHz, Ka-Band 34.36 GHz, Laser
Taiwan	Legal	Effective 1 July 1987, radar detectors used in motor vehicles risked being administratively fined 1200 to 2400 new Taiwan dollars and confiscated. Effective 1 July 2006, radar detectors would no longer be banned in motor vehicles.	X, K, Ku, Laser (Possibly others)
Turkey	Illegal	Radar jammers are illegal	
UAE	Illegal		
United Kingdom	Legal, although prior to 1998 the Police would attempt prosecutions under the Wireless and Telegraphy act 1949, laser jammers are still a grey area in the use of them.		
United States	In Virginia, it is unlawful to operate a motor vehicle on the Commonwealth’s highways when the vehicle is equipped with a radar detector; the statute exempts a device with no power source that is not readily accessible to the driver or a passenger. In the District of Columbia, it is unlawful to sell, use, or possess in an automobile a device used to detect or counteract police radar. Federal regulation prohibits a driver from using a radar detector in a commercial motor vehicle, or operating a commercial motor vehicle equipped with or containing one. Use of radar detectors on U.S. military installations is prohibited.	Virginia law does not authorize permanent forfeiture of a radar detector. An officer may take one as evidence when needed, and it must be returned when no longer needed. Windshield-placement rules are separate from radar-detector legality. For example, California restricts objects placed or affixed on vehicle windows, while Minnesota restricts objects suspended between the driver and windshield. Radar jammers are prohibited under federal law.	X, K, Ka, Laser
Vietnam	Illegal		

== See also ==
- Laser jammer
- Road safety
- Traffic enforcement camera
