= Cosine error =

Type of measurement error

Cosine error is a type of measurement error caused by the difference between the intended and actual directions in which a measurement is taken. Depending on the type of measurement, it either multiplies or divides the true value by the cosine of the angle between the two directions.

For small angles the resulting error is typically very small, since an angle needs to be relatively large for its cosine to depart significantly from 1.

Approximate error sizes for a few example angles are:

Angle	Error
10°	1.5%	= 1 part in 65 or 66
1°	0.015%	= 1 part in 6,600
0.1°	0.00015%	= 1 part in 660,000
0.01°	0.0000015%	= 1 part in 66,000,000

The error is equivalent to treating the hypotenuse and one of the other sides of a right-angled triangle as if they were equal; the cosine of the angle between them is the ratio of their lengths.

== Concept ==
A simple example of cosine error is taking a measurement across a rectangle but failing to realize that the line of measurement is not quite parallel with the edges, being slightly diagonal. Rather than measuring the desired vector (in this case, orthogonal width), the instrument is measuring the hypotenuse of a triangle in which the desired vector is in fact one of the legs. The cosine of this triangle correlates to how much error exists in the measurement (hence the name cosine error). Thus the user might measure a block of metal and come away with a width of 208.92 mm when the true width is 208.91 mm, a difference that matters to the subsequent machining.

== Examples ==
Some practical examples in which the potential for cosine error must be considered include:

- The use of an indicator (distance amplifying instrument)
- Laser interferometry
- Speed limit enforcement
  - Lidar traffic enforcement
  - Radar traffic enforcement

== Mitigation ==
The longer the length of the instrument, the easier it is to control cosine error. If the instrument is very small, then optical alignment techniques can be used to reduce cosine error.
