= Misuse detection =

Misuse detection actively works against potential insider threats to vulnerable computer data.

== Misuse ==
Misuse detection is an approach to detecting computer attacks. In a misuse detection approach, abnormal system behaviour is defined first, and then all other behaviour is defined as normal. It stands against the anomaly detection approach which utilizes the reverse: defining normal system behaviour first and defining all other behaviour as abnormal. With misuse detection, anything not known is normal. An example of misuse detection is the use of attack signatures in an intrusion detection system. Misuse detection has also been used more generally to refer to all kinds of computer misuse.
