= Radar speed gun =

Measuring device

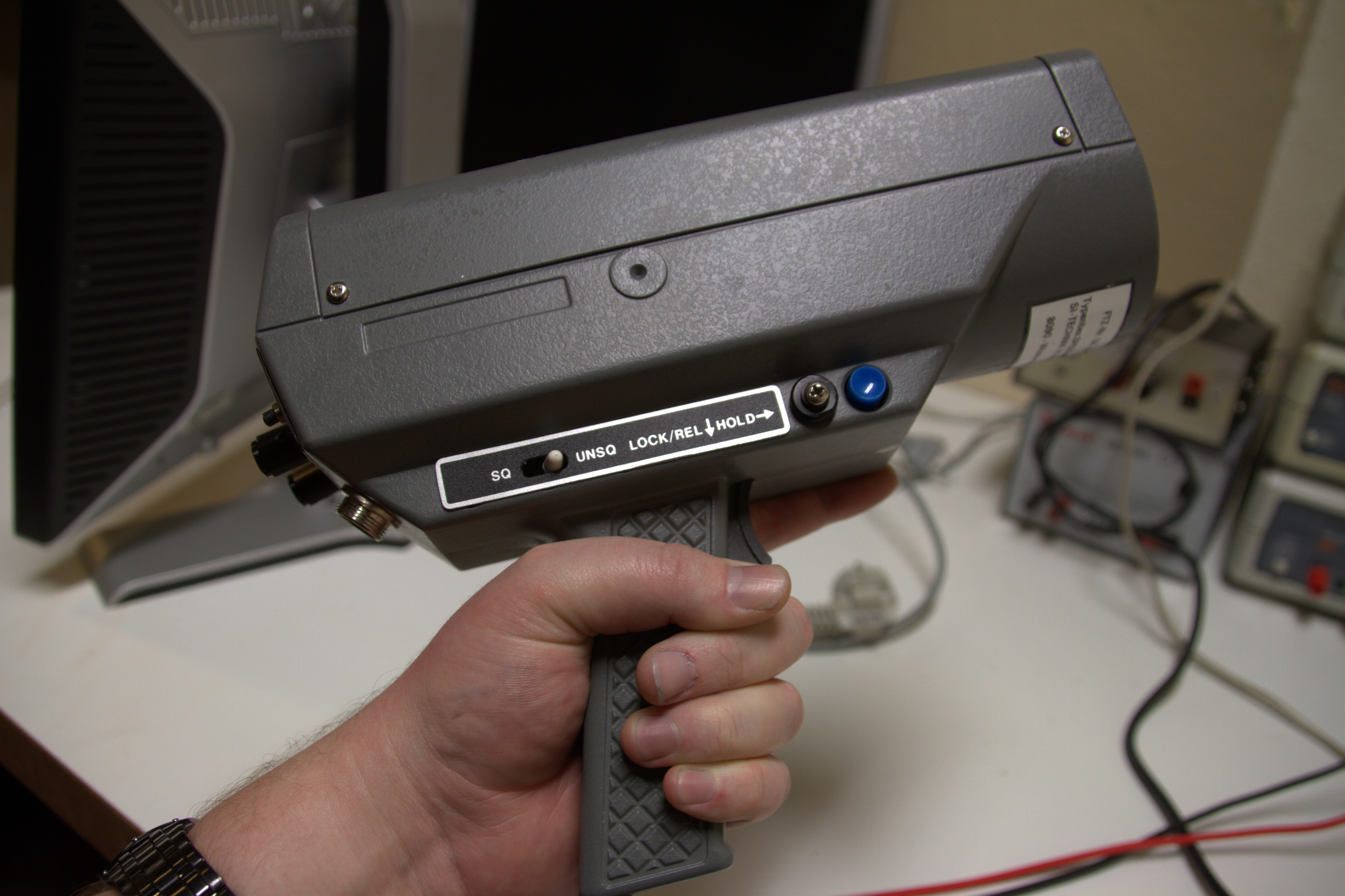
Handheld radar speed gun

A radar speed gun, also known as a radar gun, speed gun, or speed trap gun, is a device used to measure the speed of moving objects. It is commonly used by police to check the speed of moving vehicles while conducting traffic enforcement, and in professional sports to measure speeds such as those of baseball pitches, tennis serves, and cricket bowls.

A radar speed gun is a Doppler radar unit that may be handheld, vehicle-mounted, or static. It measures the speed of the objects at which it is pointed by detecting a change in frequency of the returned radar signal caused by the Doppler effect, whereby the frequency of the returned signal is increased in proportion to the object's speed of approach if the object is approaching, and lowered if the object is receding. Such devices are frequently used for speed limit enforcement, alongside more modern LIDAR speed gun instruments, which use pulsed laser light instead of radar. While radar speed guns may be used while stationary, LIDAR speed guns are often favored over radar speed guns for stationary enforcement applications due to increased targeting precision.

== History ==
The radar speed gun was invented by John L. Barker Sr., and Ben Midlock, who developed radar for the military while working for the Automatic Signal Company (later Automatic Signal Division of LFE Corporation) in Norwalk, Connecticut during World War II. Originally, Automatic Signal was approached by Grumman to solve the specific problem of terrestrial landing gear damage on the Consolidated PBY Catalina amphibious aircraft. Barker and Midlock cobbled a Doppler radar unit from coffee cans soldered shut to make microwave resonators. The unit was installed at the end of the runway at Grumman's Bethpage, New York facility, and aimed directly upward to measure the sink rate of landing PBYs. After the war, Barker and Midlock tested radar on the Merritt Parkway. In 1947, the system was tested by the Connecticut State Police in Glastonbury, Connecticut, initially for traffic surveys and issuing warnings to drivers for excessive speed. Starting in February 1949, the state police began to issue speeding tickets based on the speed recorded by the radar device. In 1948, radar was also used in Garden City, New York.

== Mechanism ==
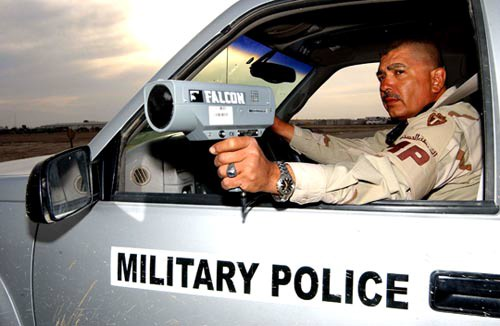
A U.S. Army Military Police Corps officer using a radar gun at Tallil Air Base in Iraq

=== Doppler effect ===
Radar speed guns use Doppler radar to perform speed measurements.

Radar speed guns, like other types of radar, consist of a radio transmitter and receiver. They send out a radio signal in a narrow beam, then receive the same signal back after it bounces off the target object. Due to a phenomenon called the Doppler effect, if the object is moving toward or away from the gun, the frequency of the reflected radio waves when they come back is different from the transmitted waves. When the object is approaching the radar, the frequency of the return waves is higher than the transmitted waves; when the object is moving away, the frequency is lower. From that difference, the radar speed gun can calculate the speed of the object from which the waves have been bounced. This speed is given by the following equation:

$${v}=\frac {\Delta f}{f} \times {\frac {c}{2}}$$

where $c$ is the speed of light, $f$ is the emitted frequency of the radio waves, and $\Delta f$ is the difference in frequency between the radio waves that are emitted and those received back by the gun. This equation holds precisely only when object speeds are low compared to that of light, but in everyday situations, this is the case and the velocity of an object is directly proportional to this difference in frequency.

=== Stationary radar ===
After the returning waves are received, a signal with a frequency equal to this difference is created by mixing the received radio signal with a little of the transmitted signal. Just as two different musical notes played together create a beat note at the difference in frequency between them, so when these two radio signals are mixed they create a "beat" signal (called a heterodyne). An electrical circuit then measures this frequency using a digital counter to count the number of cycles in a fixed time period, and displays the number on a digital display as the object's speed.

Since this type of speed gun measures the difference in speed between a target and the gun itself, the gun must be stationary in order to give a correct reading. If a measurement is made from a moving car, it will give the difference in speed between the two vehicles, not the speed of the target relative to the road, so a different system has been designed to work from moving vehicles.

=== Moving radar ===
In "moving radar", the radar antenna receives reflected signals from both the target vehicle and stationary background objects such as the road surface, nearby road signs, guard rails and streetlight poles. Instead of comparing the frequency of the signal reflected from the target with the transmitted signal, it compares the target signal with this background signal. The frequency difference between these two signals gives the true speed of the target vehicle.

=== Design considerations ===
Modern radar speed guns normally operate at X, K, K_{a}, and (in Europe) K_{u} bands.

Radar guns that operate using the X band (8 to 12 GHz) frequency range are becoming less common because they produce a strong and easily detectable beam. Also, most automatic doors utilize radio waves in the X band range and can possibly affect the readings of police radar. As a result, K band (18 to 27 GHz) and K_{a} band (27 to 40 GHz) are most commonly used by police agencies.

Some motorists install radar detectors which can alert them to the presence of a speed trap ahead, and the microwave signals from radar may also change the quality of reception of AM and FM radio signals when tuned to a weak station. For these reasons, hand-held radar typically includes an on-off trigger and the radar is only turned on when the operator is about to make a measurement. Radar detectors are illegal in some areas.

== Limitations ==
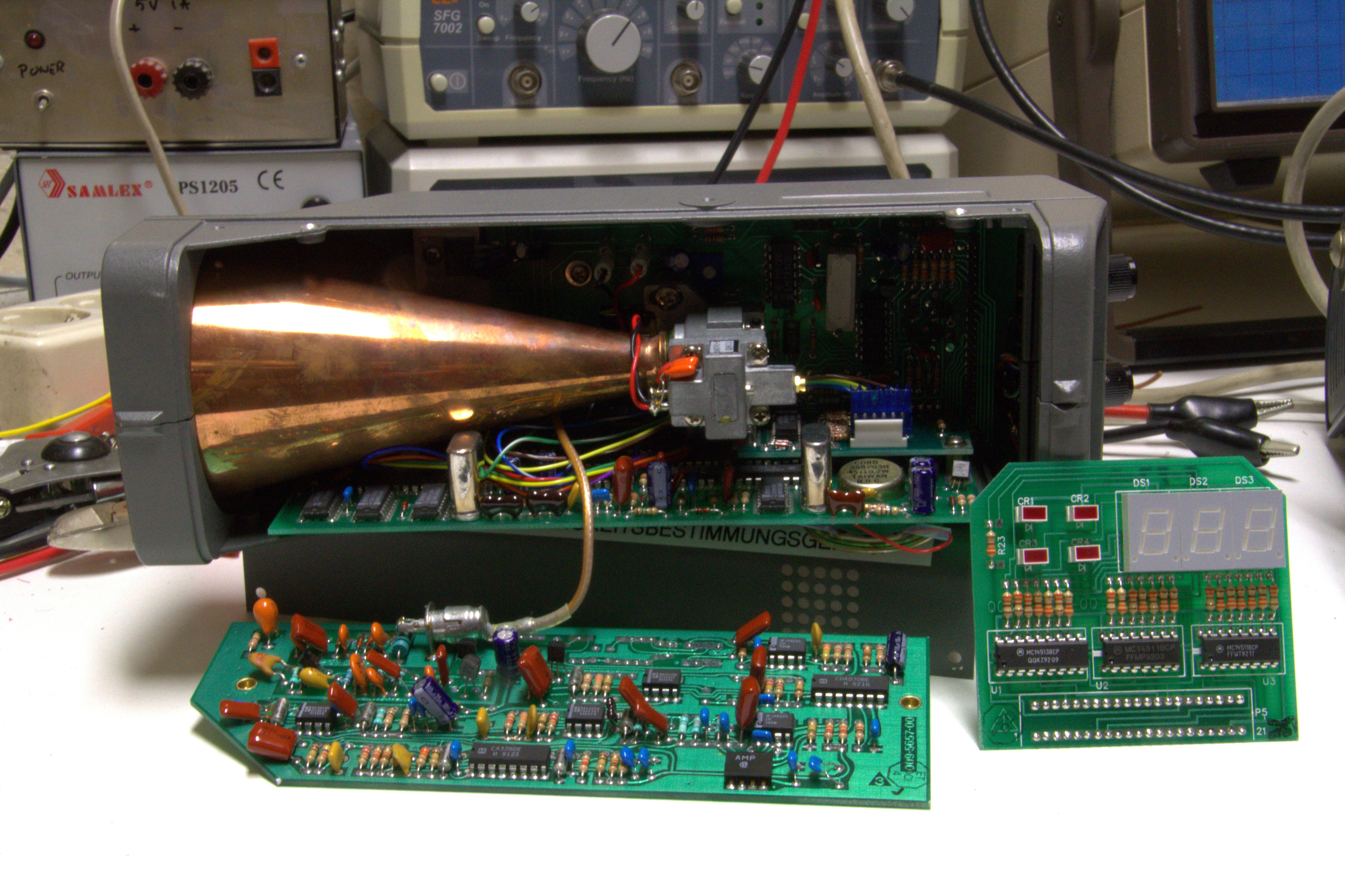
Disassembled radar speed gun. The copper cone is the microwave horn antenna. At the right end is the Gunn diode oscillator which generates the microwaves.

Traffic radar comes in many models. Hand-held units are mostly battery powered, and for the most part are used as stationary speed enforcement tools. Stationary radar can be mounted in police vehicles and may have one or two antennae. Moving radar is employed, as the name implies, when a police vehicle is in motion and can be very sophisticated, able to track vehicles approaching and receding, both in front of and behind the patrol vehicle and also able to track multiple targets at once. It can also track the fastest vehicle in the selected radar beam, front or rear.

However, there are a number of limitations to the use of radar speed guns. For example, user training and certification are required so that a radar operator can use the equipment effectively, with trainees being required to consistently visually estimate vehicle speed within +/-2 mph of actual target speed, for example if the target's actual speed is 30 mph then the operator must be able to consistently visually estimate the target speed as falling between 28 and 32 mph. Stationary traffic enforcement radar must occupy a location above or to the side of the road, so the user must understand trigonometry to accurately estimate vehicle speed as the direction changes while a single vehicle moves within the field of view. Actual vehicle speed and radar measurement thus are rarely the same due to what is known as the cosine effect, however, for all practical purposes this difference in actual speed and measured speed is inconsequential, generally being less than 1 mph difference, as police are trained to position the radar to minimize this inaccuracy and when present the error is always in the favor of the driver reporting a lower than actual speed.

Additionally, the placement of the radar can be important as well to avoid large reflective surfaces near the radar. Such reflective surfaces can create a multi-path scenario where the radar beam can be reflected off of the unintended reflective target and find another target and return thereby causing a reading that can be confused for the traffic being monitored. However, MythBusters did an episode on trying to get the gun to have incorrect readings by changing the surface of the passing object and found no significant effect.

Radar speed guns do not differentiate between targets in traffic, and proper operator training is essential for accurate speed enforcement. This inability to differentiate among targets in the radar's field of view is the primary reason for the operator being required to consistently and accurately visually estimate target speeds to within +/-2 mph, so that, for example if there are seven targets in the radar's field of view and the operator is able to visually estimate the speed of six of those targets as approximately 40 mph and visually estimate the speed of one of those targets as approximately 55 mph and the radar unit is displaying a reading of 56 mph it becomes clear which target's speed the unit is measuring.

In moving radar operation, another potential limitation occurs when the radar's patrol speed locks onto other moving targets rather than the actual ground speed. This can occur if the position of the radar is too close to a larger reflective target such as a tractor trailer. To help alleviate this the use of secondary speed inputs from the vehicle's CAN bus, VSS signal, or the use of a GPS-measured speed can help to reduce errors by giving a secondary speed to compare the measured speed against.

=== Challenging accuracy of device ===
Most radar guns come with a manufacturer-specified margin of error. The margin of error is typically around ±1 to ±2 miles per hour. This can vary based on the radar gun's quality, its calibration status, environmental conditions, and how it's used by the operator. This margin of error is a critical factor courts consider when involved in cases where a reckless driving citation requires a specific speed over the posted limit. For instance, in the State of Maryland, a reckless driving conviction requires a speed of 30 mph over the posted speed limit. A driver cited at exactly 80 mph in a 50 mph zone could conceivably challenge the margin of error of the device resulting in an acquittal.

=== Size ===
The primary limitation of hand held and mobile radar devices is size. An antenna diameter of less than several feet limits directionality, which can only partly be compensated for by increasing the frequency of the wave. Size limitations can cause hand-held and mobile radar devices to produce measurements from multiple objects within the field of view of the user.

The antenna on some of the most common hand-held devices is only 2 inches (5.1 cm) in diameter. The beam of energy produced by an antenna of this size using X-band frequencies occupies a cone that extends about 22 degrees surrounding the line of sight, 44 degrees in total width. This beam is called the main lobe. There is also a side lobe extending from 22 to 66 degrees away from the line of sight, and other lobes as well, but side lobes are about 20 times (13 dB) less sensitive than the main lobe, although they will detect moving objects close by. The primary field of view is about 130 degrees wide. K-band reduces this field of view to about 65 degrees by increasing the frequency of the wave. Ka-band reduces this further to about 40 degrees. Side lobe detections can be eliminated using side lobe blanking which narrows the field of view, but the additional antennas and complex circuitry impose size and price constraints that limit this to applications for the military, air traffic control, and weather agencies. Mobile weather radar is mounted on semi-trailer trucks in order to narrow the beam.

=== Distance ===
A second limitation for hand-held devices is that they have to use continuous-wave radar to make them light enough to be mobile. Speed measurements are only reliable when the distance at which a specific measurement has been recorded is known. Distance measurements require pulsed operation or cameras when more than one moving object is within the field of view. Continuous-wave radar may be aimed directly at a vehicle 100 yards away but produce a speed measurement from a second vehicle 1 mile away when pointed down a straight roadway. Once again, since distance information is not provided by a continuous wave radar system, training and certification requirements are important so that operators can make consistent and accurate visual estimations and thus determine the object whose speed they are measuring.

Some sophisticated devices may produce different speed measurements from multiple objects within the field of view. This is used to allow the speed-gun to be used from a moving vehicle, where a moving and a stationary object must be targeted simultaneously, and some of the most sophisticated units are capable of displaying up to four separate target speeds while operating in moving mode once again emphasizing the importance of the operators' ability to consistently and accurately visually estimate speed.

=== Environment ===
The environment and locality in which a measurement is taken can also play a role. Using a hand-held radar to scan traffic on an empty road while standing in the shade of a large tree, for example, might risk detecting the motion of the leaves and branches if the wind is blowing hard (side lobe detection). There may be an unnoticed airplane overhead, particularly if there is an airport nearby, which again emphasizes the importance of proper operator training.

== Associated cameras ==
Conventional radar gun limitations can be corrected with a camera aimed along the line of sight.

Cameras are associated with automated ticketing machines (known in the UK as speed cameras) where the radar is used to trigger a camera. The radar speed threshold is set at or above the maximum legal vehicle speed. The radar triggers the camera to take several pictures when a nearby object exceeds this speed. Two pictures are required to determine vehicle speed using roadway survey markings. This can be reliable for traffic in city environments when multiple moving objects are within the field of view. It is the camera, however, and its timing information, in this case, that determines the speed of an individual vehicle, the radar gun simply alerting the camera to start recording.

== Newer instruments ==
Laser devices, such as a LIDAR speed gun, are capable of producing reliable range and speed measurements in typical urban and suburban traffic environments without the site survey limitation and cameras. This is reliable in city traffic because LIDAR has directionality similar to a typical firearm because the beam is shaped more like a pencil that produces measurement only from the object it has been aimed at.

== See also ==
- LIDAR detector
- Radar detector
