= Lidar traffic enforcement =

Used to measure the speed of vehicles

Lidar can be used in traffic enforcement and in particular speed limit enforcement, where it has become increasingly common since the 1990s with the release of the Laser Technology Inc. 20-20. Modern lidar-based systems can automate speed detection, vehicle identification, and evidentiary documentation, though driver identification is not as commonly automated.

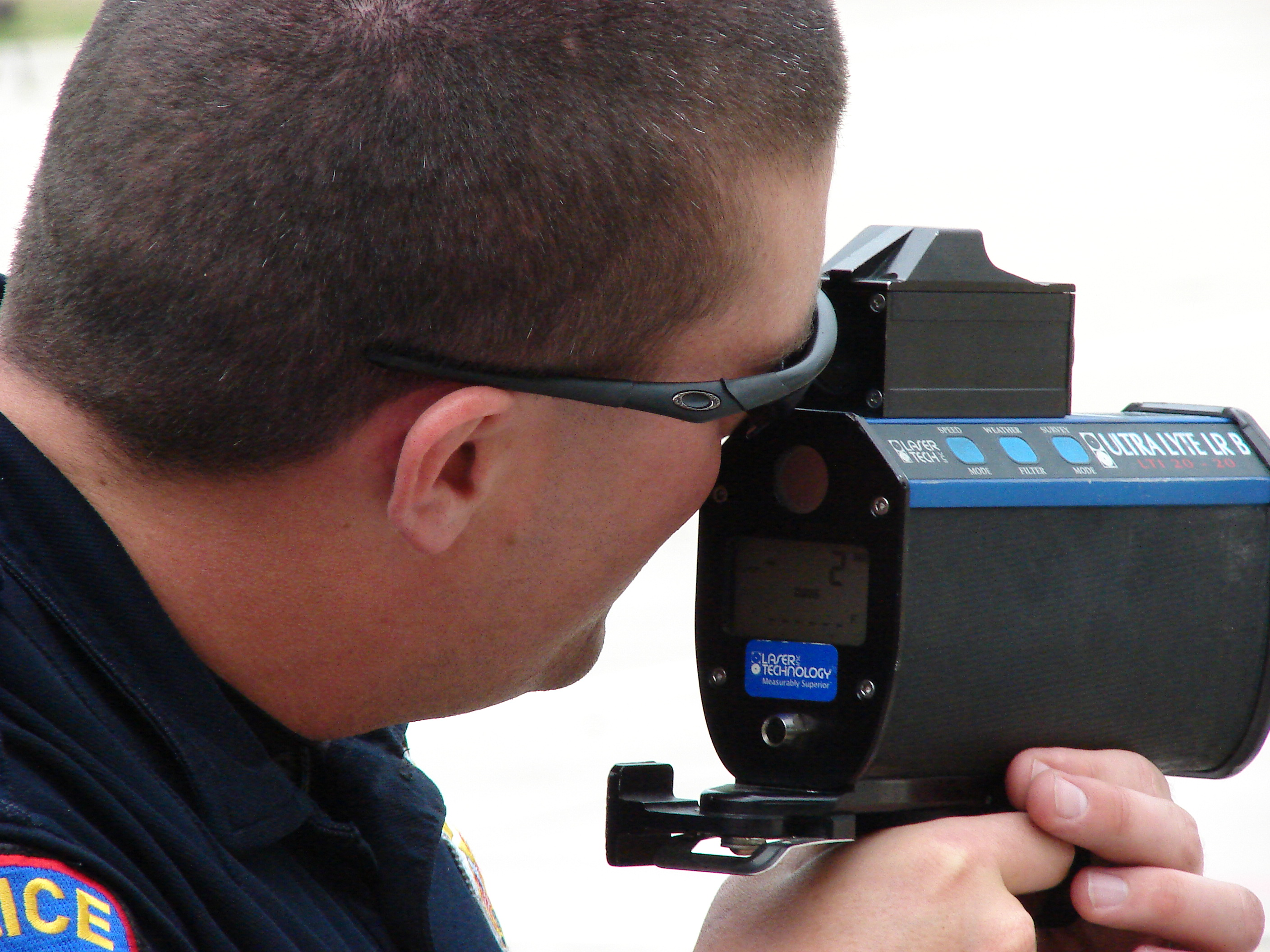
Police officer operating a hand-held lidar speed detection device

== History ==
Jeremy Dunn (Laser Technology Inc.) developed a police lidar device in 1989, and in 2004 10% of U.S. sales of traffic enforcement devices were lidar rising to 30% in 2006, with sophisticated radar units still being sold.

Current units combine five operations; speed detection; operator viewing, even under adverse conditions; imaging synchronised with speed detection; acquisition of court ready evidence; downloading of evidence to an external device. They can operate in automatic mode either attended or unattended.

== Advantages of lidar over radar ==
Radar has wide signal beam divergence, so that an individual vehicle cannot be targeted, requiring significant operator skill, training and certification in order to visually estimate speed so as to locate an offender in a traffic stream, and offenders may use the defence that some other vehicle was offending. Radar will register the speed of any object in its field, for example a tree swaying or an airplane passing overhead.

Most lidar devices have a narrow beam, and easily target individual vehicles, thereby eliminating the need for visual estimation. Some models can record an image of the license plate at the same instant as recording the speed violation along with information such as location and time. Speed estimation often takes a third of a second, which, together with the narrow, targeted beam, results in offending vehicles having little warning even when using an evasion device. Certain lidar devices can measure the distance between vehicles to detect 'too close' (tailgating) infringements. The speed of a vehicle occluded by (hidden behind) another vehicle cannot be measured. This occlusion issue does not apply to fixed speed enforcement devices that can be mounted on poles or gantries up to 5–6 meters (16–20 ft) high using radar as detection method.

== Lidar specifications ==
The US Department of Transportation National Highway Traffic Safety Administration (NHTSA) has issued specifications for lidar devices, a conforming products list, and guidelines regarding implementation of traffic enforcement.

A typical NHTSA approved device weighs less than 2 kilograms, is battery powered, has speed detection accuracy +2 km/h and -3 km/h, distance accuracy +- 0.3 metres at 90 metres, and minimum long-range measurement capability of 300 metres. Devices must be capable of meeting these accuracy standards while exposed to ambient temperatures between -30 °C and 60 °C, relative humidity of 90% at 37 °C and normal urban road ambient electromagnetic radiation. The range of speeds required to be accurately detected is 16 km/h to 320 km/h. In some jurisdictions speeding violations are required to be documented by the device with a recorded image showing license plate, location, speed, date, time and operator identification, some units identify the driver by image and record the direction of travel. The light emitted is required to be in the infrared range, meet eye safety standards, and have pulse repetition less than one kHz with beam divergence less than 5 milliradians.

== Registration plates ==
Vehicle registration plates are an important part of traffic enforcement and in most jurisdictions the government holds a monopoly on their manufacture, although this may be contracted out. Normally it is illegal for private citizens to modify, make and affix their own plates, as this is equivalent to forging an official document. California plates are required to be 6 in tall and 12 in wide, a usual standard, and have a reflective surface that is particularly sensitive to infrared light, which enables it to be imaged at night, enables Automatic License Plate Recognition, allows LIDAR devices to receive a strong reflective signal return, and have tamper-resistant markings.

Some jurisdictions do not require a front license plate on automobiles and many do not require them on certain vehicles such as motorcycles. Police generally prefer to detect from the front while observing oncoming traffic, which also enables the offender to be waved over and avoid the risks of high speeds required to catch up to the vehicle.

== Evasion ==
A number of jurisdictions prohibit any methods to thwart speed limit enforcement. Current lidar devices have a horizontal beam width of approximately one meter at 300 meters, compared to the registration plate width of 30 cm, ensuring that little of the signal is scattered to following vehicles. Detecting the LIDAR signal in advance is difficult as the tight beam, short signal duration and targeting of individual vehicles minimize scatter of the LIDAR signal to following or adjacent vehicles. Modifying the vehicle to deflect, absorb or jumble the signal is difficult, as it is typically the registration plate that is targeted. Modifying the registration plate is easily detected and may not be legal. Returning a false separate signal will be detected by current police lidar models and may not be legal, depending on the jurisdiction.

== Principle ==
A typical NHTSA approved lidar device emits 30 ns pulses of laser light with wavelength 905 nm and 50 milliwatts of power with 3 milliradian beam divergence. The power is sufficiently low to ensure no ocular damage occurs. At 905 nm wavelengths, IEC 60825-1 Edition 2.0 allows a maximum energy per pulse of 0.5uJ.

Light travels approximately 30 cm per ns so each pulse has a length of about nine metres. At a target distance of 300 metres the light pulses take 2,000 ns to complete the round trip. The time interval between pulses is no less than one million ns, providing time to make a distance estimation from each pulse. Up to several hundred pulse readings are taken over a period less than half a second and used to estimate the change in distance over time, thereby estimating vehicle speed. Returning light is filtered to exclude light not in the wavelength range 899 nm to 909 nm. An internal proprietary algorithm rejects inaccurate readings; detection avoidance methods usually attempt to overload the filter and persuade the error rejection algorithm to incorrectly reject a reading.

== Operation ==
An expert operator will use the viewing capability to select a likely offender prior to speed detection. This method has the advantage that minimal signal is scattered to warn following vehicles equipped with lidar signal detection devices, but this quality is not as important on sparsely trafficked roads where a lower capability lidar device may be used. Once a likely offender is detected and the registration plate is targeted, the operator triggers speed detection. This act includes acquisition of evidence, and an audible tone indicates a good return signal. To produce an accurate reading, the operator must focus the pulse on a single point for the duration of the read. At long range this is accomplished through the use of a stationary tripod that steadies the aim. For speed detection, any part of the vehicle may be targeted, although the registration plate is highly preferred.

== Limitations ==
Normal weather conditions have negligible impact on device performance but may impede operator ability to target a vehicle. This includes occasions when the sun is directly behind the target vehicle, nighttime, or when the device is used within a stationary vehicle with a soiled windshield, in which case the signal might be scattered. Heavy weather may reduce the range of the device and in particular heavy fog will render it unusable. Many modern lidar devices have "weather modes" that increase the minimum range in order to counteract rain reflection.

Like radar, lidar is subject to cosine error effect.

Sweeping the device while taking a reading so that (particularly at long range where angular separation between targets is slight) pulses return from more than one target creates a false reading. Sweeping along the side of a vehicle may also cause false readings.

A false reading may be produced when the pulse reflects off a wing mirror or hits a stationary reflective object and then returns to reflect off the mirror a second time.

== Use in court ==
=== United States ===
In 2008, the D.C. Superior Court upheld the admissibility of lidar evidence in its jurisdiction. In addition to expert testimony, the court noted that it factored scientific publications into its decision:

The Court conducted an extensive four-day Frye [Daubert] hearing... [in which it] considered such issues as the basic science of laser technology, the technical methodology of, and theoretical challenges to, the reliability of radar guns... including the possibility of other “pulses” in the vicinity of use, difficulties in target identification, possible errors caused by vehicle license plates, windshield glass, shape, and color, and potential malfunction of the device. The Court also took judicial notice of at least six scientific publications on the subject in various journals of interest, together with two police-related studies in Florida, one New Jersey [study], and one independent study in Florida on this and similar radar devices, all of which met the standards set forth by [the] National Highway Safety Administration...

The court also noted that not a single court had conducted full-blown hearings on the issue that found LiDAR unreliable, while more than a dozen jurisdictions had decided that lidar is reliable.

== Detectors and jammers ==
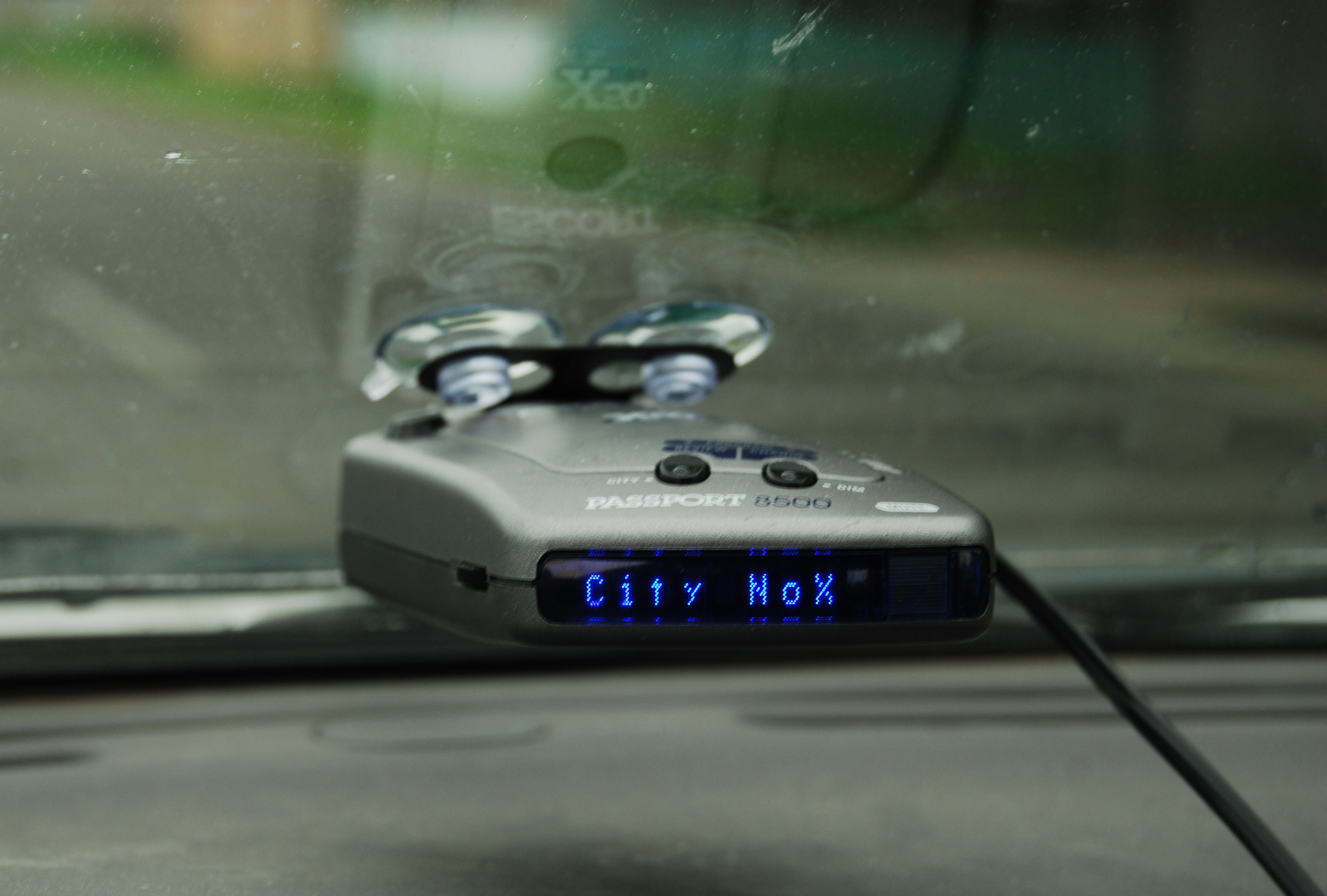
Passport x50 Radar/Laser detector

A lidar detector or laser detector is a passive device designed to detect infrared emissions, especially those of law enforcement agencies' lidar speed detection devices, and warn motorists that their speed is being measured.

A limitation of lidar is that it cannot be used while a police car is in motion, because it requires the operator to actively target each vehicle, whereas traditional radar can be operated while the police officer is driving. Other restrictions include a precipitation-free environment, as the laser can produce erratic readings from airborne moisture or smoke. Popularity of lidar speed detection is on the rise, though, as costs decline, ease of operation approaches radar and existing radar equipment reaches its end-of-service life and is rotated out of service.

Lidar detectors are generally less effective than radar detectors as the emissions they monitor are briefer, more concentrated and less easily scattered than radar. A motorist may therefore not have sufficient time to respond to the burst transmission of a lidar device, or the narrow beam might be focused on a specific part of a vehicle where the sensor cannot detect it.

A laser jammer or lidar jammer is an electronic device used by drivers to prevent users of a LIDAR (or laser) gun from obtaining speed readings of their vehicle. Laser jammers are not to be confused with radar jammers. Many modern lidar devices feature anti-jamming modes that can defeat laser jammers.

To jam LIDAR, laser jammers first must detect the emitted light, normally infrared light on the 904 nm wavelength. After detecting the lidar gun's light, the jammer will send out light on the same wavelength at a higher intensity, effectively confusing the gun into returning no speed reading. Newer laser jammer models can detect the pulse rate (the rate at which the gun takes distance measurements, upon which it bases the speed measurement) of the laser gun, and then emulate that pulse rate, further increasing the difficulty of getting an accurate reading from the laser gun.

Because these jammers focus on blocking light emitted from laser guns, and not radio waves from radar guns, US federal laws prohibiting the use of radar jammers do not apply to these devices. While the U.S. Federal Communications Commission regulates transmission of radio waves, the U.S. Food and Drug Administration regulates light emissions. However, several states have passed laws that specifically prohibit the use of laser jammers, including: California, Colorado, Illinois, Iowa, Minnesota, Oklahoma, South Carolina, Tennessee, Texas, Utah, and Virginia. Washington, D.C. prohibits radar detection and jamming devices, but the regulation predates laser technology and does not explicitly address laser jammers. Nebraska is frequently listed as illegal, but its statute prohibits "radar transmission devices" and does not address laser jammers.

== See also ==
- Video detection and ranging (VIDAR)
