= Priority R-tree =

The Priority R-tree is a worst-case asymptotically optimal alternative to the spatial tree R-tree. It was first proposed by Arge, De Berg, Haverkort and Yi, K. in an article from 2004. The prioritized R-tree is essentially a hybrid between a k-dimensional tree and a R-tree in that it defines a given object's N-dimensional bounding volume (called Minimum Bounding Rectangles – MBR) as a point in N-dimensions, represented by the ordered pair of the rectangles. The term prioritized arrives from the introduction of four priority-leaves that represents the most extreme values of each dimensions, included in every branch of the tree. Before answering a window-query by traversing the sub-branches, the prioritized R-tree first checks for overlap in its priority nodes. The sub-branches are traversed (and constructed) by checking whether the least value of the first dimension of the query is above the value of the sub-branches. This gives access to a quick indexation by the value of the first dimension of the bounding box.

== Performance ==
Arge et al. writes that the priority tree always answers window-queries with $O\left(\left(\frac N B\right)^{1- \frac 1 d} + \frac T B\right)$ I/Os, where N is the number of d-dimensional (hyper-) rectangles stored in the R-tree, B is the disk block size, and T is the output size.

== Dimensions ==
In the case of $d = 2$ the rectangle is represented by $\, ((x_{min}, y_{min}), (x_{max}, y_{max}))$ and the MBR thus four corners $\, (x_{min}, y_{min}, x_{max}, y_{max})$.

== See also ==
- Bounding volume hierarchy
- B-tree
- R-tree
