= Htree (disambiguation) =

Htree is a version of a B-tree, and indexing structure used in Linux file systems.

Htree may also refer to:

- H tree, a family of fractal sets

== See also ==
- Hilbert R-tree
