= Elongatedness =

Elongatedness

In image processing, elongatedness for a region is the ratio between the length and width of the minimum bounding rectangle of the region. It is considered a feature of the region. It can be evaluated as the ratio between the area of the region to its thickness squared:

$elongatedness = \frac{length}{width} = \frac{area}{(2 d)^2}$.

where the maximum thickness, $d$, of a holeless region is given by the number of times the region can be eroded before disappearing.
