= Filter and refine =

Computational strategy for large datasets

Filter and Refine Principle (FRP) is a general computational strategy in computer science. FRP is used broadly across various disciplines, particularly in information retrieval, database management, and pattern recognition, which efficiently processes large sets of objects through a two-stage approach: filtering and refinement.

The filtering stage quickly eliminates less promising or irrelevant objects from a large set using efficient, less resource-intensive algorithms. This stage is designed to reduce the volume of data that needs to be processed in the more resource-demanding refinement stage.

Following filtering, the refinement stage applies more complex and computationally expensive techniques to the remaining objects to achieve higher accuracy via finer-grained processing. This stage is essential for obtaining the desired quality and precision in the results.

FRP is a general method for completing a computationally intensive task as quickly as possible (Filter and Refine Strategy), which is important in scenarios where managing the inherent trade-offs between speed and accuracy is crucial. Its implementations span various fields and applications, from database indexing/query processing, and information retrieval to machine learning and big data analytics. Its implementation helps in optimizing systems to better manage the inherent trade-offs between speed and accuracy.

== Overview ==
FRP follows a two-step processing strategy:

1. Filter: an efficient filter function $f_{filter}$ is applied to each object $x$ in the dataset $\mathcal{D}$. The filtered subset $\mathcal{D}'$ is defined as $\mathcal{D}' = \{x | f_{filter}(x) \ge v\}$ for value-based tasks, where $v$ is a threshold value, or $\mathcal{D}' = \{x | f_{filter}(x) = v\}$ for type-based tasks, where $v$ is the target type(s).
2. Refine: a more complex refinement function $f_{refine}$ is applied to each object $x$ in $\mathcal{D}'$, resulting in the set $\mathcal{R} = \{x | f_{refine}(x) \ge v\}$, or likewise, $\mathcal{R} = \{x | f_{refine}(x) = v\}$, as the final output.

This strategy balances the trade-offs between processing speed and accuracy, which is crucial in situations where resources such as time, memory, or computation are limited.

== Applications in Specific Fields ==
=== Reinforcement Learning ===
In the domain of artificial intelligence, Reinforcement Learning (RL) demonstrates the Filter and Refine Principle (FRP) through the processes of policy and value function estimation. In RL, agents learn to make decisions by exploring the environment and receiving feedback in the form of rewards. For example, in AlphaZero, the filtering stage in RL involves narrowing down the set of possible actions at each state by using a policy network, which predicts potentially rewarding actions based on previous experiences. This approach reduces the search space significantly, enabling more efficient learning processes.

The refinement stage in RL involves more detailed simulations or deeper analysis through techniques like Monte Carlo tree search (MCTS) or temporal difference learning, which refine the policy and value estimates to optimize long-term rewards. This step is crucial for fine-tuning the strategy to achieve optimal performance, particularly in complex environments where numerous possible actions and outcomes exist. RL's application of FRP is critical in scenarios requiring both quick decision-making and high accuracy, such as in autonomous vehicles and gaming.

=== Mixture of Experts ===
The mixture of experts (MoE) is a machine learning paradigm that incorporates FRP by dividing a complex problem into simpler, manageable sub-tasks, each handled by a specialized expert. In the filtering stage, a gating mechanism—acting as a filter that determines the most suitable expert for each specific part of the input data based on the data's characteristics. This stage is critical as it allows the system to allocate resources more efficiently by engaging only the most relevant experts for each task.

During the refinement stage, each chosen expert applies its specialized knowledge to process the input more thoroughly. This approach enhances the overall system's performance by combining the strengths of various experts tailored to different aspects of the data. The refinement ensures that each segment of the input is processed optimally, leading to improved accuracy and adaptability of the model across diverse scenarios. MoE models are particularly effective in tasks where different types of expertise are beneficial, such as in complex decision-making systems and large-scale classification problems.

=== Cascading Classifiers ===
Cascading classifiers in computer vision exemplify the Filter and Refine Principle (FRP) by employing a hierarchical arrangement of classifiers, each increasing in complexity and precision. Initial classifiers quickly filter out clearly irrelevant data, significantly reducing the dataset's volume for processing by subsequent stages. This early filtering allows for a rapid reduction in data size, streamlining the process.

As the dataset moves through each stage of the cascade, the remaining data becomes progressively smaller and consists of increasingly complex cases. Later classifiers refine the decisions by focusing intensively on these challenging cases, ensuring high accuracy while minimizing computational demands. This technique is especially effective in real-time scenarios such as face detection in video streams, where fast processing is critical. The cascading approach not only accelerates processing speeds but also enhances the system's capability to manage complex tasks efficiently under tight resource constraints.

=== Query Processing ===
Query processing in large databases and information retrieval systems frequently employ the FRP to handle vast amounts of data efficiently. Initially, a query processor filters data through mechanisms like query optimization, where queries are reformulated and simplified to reduce the computational cost. This process might involve selecting the most efficient query plan or utilizing statistical estimates to quickly prune large data sections that do not match the query criteria. This initial filtering stage is crucial to ensure that the system uses its resources effectively, preparing the ground for more detailed examination. For instance, techniques such as iDistance exemplify this approach by first filtering candidate points in high-dimensional spaces and then refining the results through exact distance calculations.

In the refinement stage of query processing, the system performs a detailed execution of the chosen query plan. This involves accessing the actual data, applying more complex filters, and performing operations such as joins, aggregations, and sorts on the narrowed-down data set. This stage refines the results to meet the query's exact specifications, ensuring high precision and relevance. This dual-stage processing is fundamental in environments with large, complex data sets where performance and accuracy are critical, such as in online transaction processing systems and large-scale analytical queries.

== History and Development ==
The principles underlying FRP can be traced back to early efforts in optimizing database systems. The principle is the main optimization strategy of indices, where indices serve as a means to retrieve a subset of data quickly without scanning a large portion of the database, and do a thorough check on the subset of data upon retrieval. The core idea is to reduce both disk I/O and computational cost. The principle is used in query processing and data intensive applications. For example, in Jack A. Orenstein's 1986 SIGMOD paper, “Spatial Query Processing in an Object-Oriented Database System,” proposed concepts related to FRP as the study explores efficient methods for spatial query processing within databases. Further formalization of FRP was explicitly proposed in the 1999 paper by Ho-Hyun Park et al., “Early Separation of Filter and Refinement Steps in Spatial Query Optimization”. This paper systematically applied the FRP strategy to enhance spatial query optimization, marking a significant point in the history of FRP's application in computational tasks.

The Filter and Refine Principle (FRP) has been a cornerstone in the evolution of computational systems. Its origins can be traced back to early computing practices where efficiency and resource management were critical, leading to the development of algorithms and systems that implicitly used FRP-like strategies. Over the decades, as computational resources expanded and the complexity of tasks increased, the need for formalizing such a principle became evident. This led to a more structured application of FRP across various domains, from databases and operating systems to network design and machine learning, where trade-offs between speed and accuracy are continuously managed.

FRP as a distinct principle has been increasingly cited in academic literature and industry practices as systems face growing volumes of data and demand for real-time processing. This recognition is a testament to the evolving nature of technology and the need for frameworks that can adaptively manage the dual demands of efficiency and precision. Today, FRP is integral to the design of scalable systems that require handling large datasets efficiently, ensuring that it remains relevant in the era of big data, artificial intelligence, and beyond.

== See also ==
- Database tuning
- Learnable function
