= R+ tree =

Tree data structure in computer science

An R+ tree is a method for looking up data using a location, often (x, y) coordinates, and often for locations on the surface of the Earth. Searching on one number is a solved problem; searching on two or more, and asking for locations that are nearby in both x and y directions, requires craftier algorithms.

Fundamentally, an R+ tree is a tree data structure, a variant of the R tree, used for indexing spatial information.

== Difference between R+ trees and R trees ==
R+ trees are a compromise between R-trees and kd-trees: they avoid overlapping of internal nodes by inserting an object into multiple leaves if necessary. Coverage is the entire area to cover all related rectangles. Overlap is the entire area which is contained in two or more nodes. Minimal coverage reduces the amount of "dead space" (empty area) which is covered by the nodes of the R-tree. Minimal overlap reduces the set of search paths to the leaves (even more critical for the access time than minimal coverage). Efficient search requires minimal coverage and overlap.

R+ trees differ from R trees in that: nodes are not guaranteed to be at least half filled, the entries of any internal node do not overlap, and an object ID may be stored in more than one leaf node.

== Advantages ==
Because nodes are not overlapped with each other, point query performance benefits since all spatial regions are covered by at most one node. A single path is followed and fewer nodes are visited than with the R-tree.

== Disadvantages ==
Since rectangles are duplicated, an R+ tree can be larger than an R tree built on same data set. Construction and maintenance of R+ trees is more complex than the construction and maintenance of R trees and other variants of the R tree.
