= Minimum bounding rectangle =

Smallest rectangle which encloses some planar set of points

A series of geometric shapes enclosed by its minimum bounding rectangle

In computational geometry, the minimum bounding rectangle (MBR), also known as bounding box (BBOX) or envelope, is an expression of the maximum extents of a two-dimensional object (e.g. point, line, polygon) or set of objects within its x-y coordinate system; in other words min(x), max(x), min(y), max(y). The MBR is a 2-dimensional case of the minimum bounding box.

MBRs are frequently used as an indication of the general position of a geographic feature or dataset, for either display, first-approximation spatial query, or spatial indexing purposes.

The degree to which an "overlapping rectangles" query based on MBRs will be satisfactory (in other words, produce a low number of "false positive" hits) will depend on the extent to which individual spatial objects occupy (fill) their associated MBR. If the MBR is full or nearly so (for example, a mapsheet aligned with axes of latitude and longitude will normally entirely fill its associated MBR in the same coordinate space), then the "overlapping rectangles" test will be entirely reliable for that and similar spatial objects. On the other hand, if the MBR describes a dataset consisting of a diagonal line, or a small number of disjunct points (patchy data), then most of the MBR will be empty and an "overlapping rectangles" test will produce a high number of false positives. One system that attempts to deal with this problem, particularly for patchy data, is c-squares.

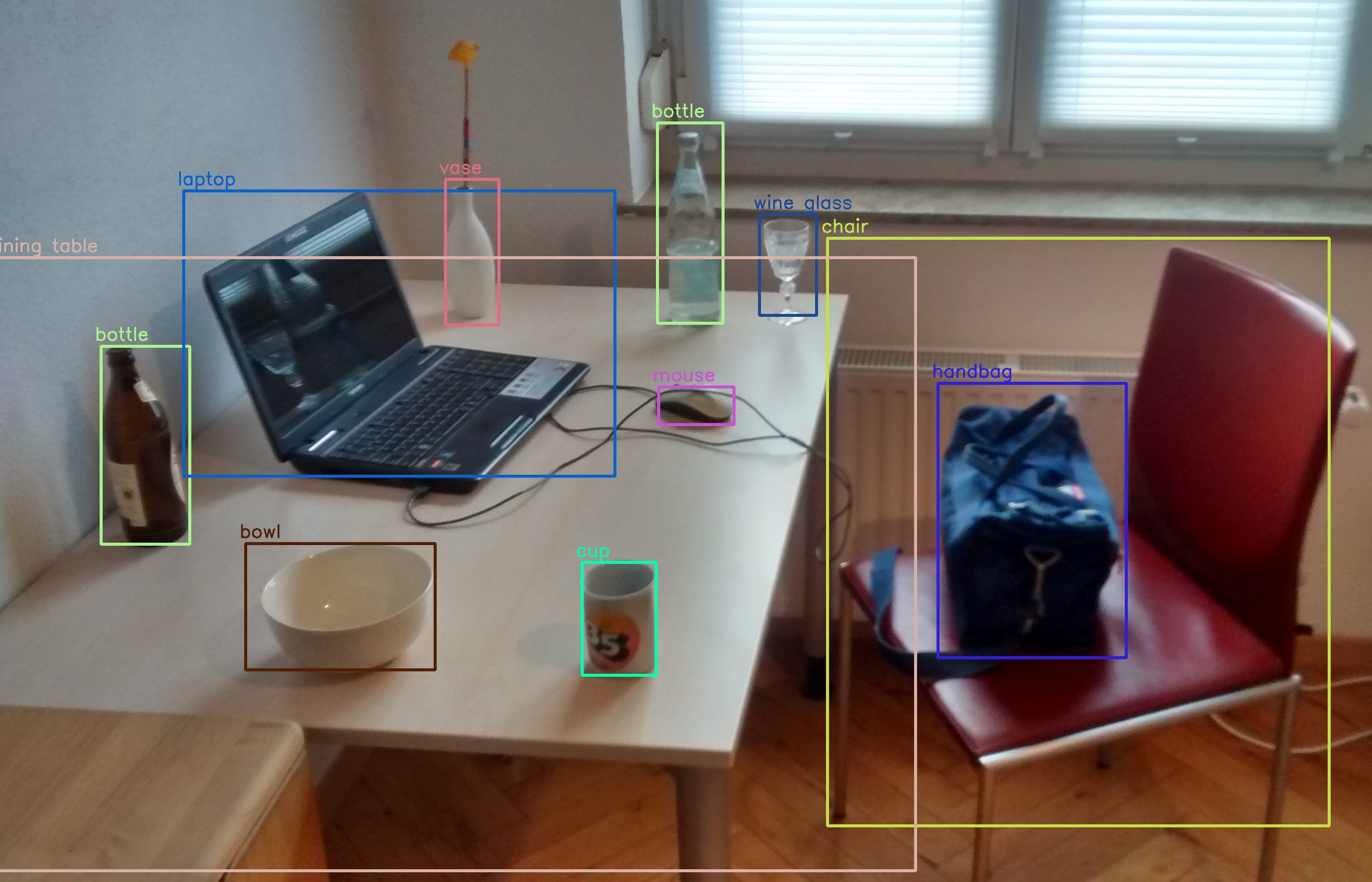
Minimum bounding rectangles used in computer vision

MBRs are also an essential prerequisite for the R-tree method of spatial indexing.

== As spatial metadata ==
Owing to their simplicity of expression and ease of use for searching, MBRs (frequently as "bounding box" or "bounding coordinates") are also commonly included in relevant standards for geospatial metadata, i.e. metadata that describe spatial (geographic) objects; examples include DCMI Box as an extension to the Dublin Core metadata scheme, "Bounding Coordinates" in the (U.S.) FGDC metadata standard, and "Geographic Bounding Box" in the (2003–current) ISO 19115 Metadata Standard for geographic information (ISO/TC 211). It is also (as "boundingBox") an element in Geography Markup Language (GML), that is utilised by a range of Web Service specifications from the Open Geospatial Consortium (OGC). In the ISO 19107 Spatial Schema (ISO/TC 211), MBR appears as the datatype GM_Envelope that is returned by the envelope() operation on the root class GM_Object.

== See also ==
- Bounding parallelogram
- C-squares
- Darboux integral
- Elongatedness
- Geographic information system
- Geospatial metadata
- Largest empty rectangle, also known as maximal empty rectangle
- Minimum bounding box
- R-tree
- Shapefile
- Spatial index
- Convex hull
