= Outline of machine learning =

Overview of and topical guide to machine learning

The following outline is provided as an overview of, and topical guide to, machine learning:

Machine learning (ML) is a subfield of artificial intelligence within computer science that evolved from the study of pattern recognition and computational learning theory. In 1959, Arthur Samuel defined machine learning as a "field of study that gives computers the ability to learn without being explicitly programmed". ML involves the study and construction of algorithms that can learn from and make predictions on data. These algorithms operate by building a model from a training set of example observations to make data-driven predictions or decisions expressed as outputs, rather than following strictly static program instructions.

== How can machine learning be categorized? ==
- An academic discipline
- A branch of science
  - An applied science
    - A subfield of computer science
      - A branch of artificial intelligence
      - A subfield of soft computing
      - Application of statistics

=== Paradigms of machine learning ===
- Supervised learning, where the model is trained on labeled data
- Unsupervised learning, where the model tries to identify patterns in unlabeled data
- Reinforcement learning, where the model learns to make decisions by receiving rewards or penalties.

== Applications of machine learning ==
- Applications of machine learning
- Bioinformatics
- Biomedical informatics
- Computer vision
- Customer relationship management
- Data mining
- Earth sciences
- Email filtering
- Inverted pendulum (balance and equilibrium system)
- Natural language processing
  - Named Entity Recognition
  - Automatic summarization
  - Automatic taxonomy construction
  - Dialog system
  - Grammar checker
  - Language recognition
    - Handwriting recognition
    - Optical character recognition
    - Speech recognition
      - Text to Speech Synthesis
      - Speech Emotion Recognition
  - Machine translation
  - Question answering
  - Speech synthesis
  - Text mining
    - Term frequency–inverse document frequency
  - Text simplification
- Pattern recognition
  - Facial recognition system
  - Handwriting recognition
  - Image recognition
  - Optical character recognition
  - Speech recognition
- Recommendation system
  - Collaborative filtering
  - Content-based filtering
  - Hybrid recommender systems
- Search engine
  - Search engine optimization
- Social engineering

== Machine learning hardware ==
- Graphics processing unit
- Tensor processing unit
- Vision processing unit

== Machine learning tools ==
- Comparison of machine learning software
- Comparison of deep learning software

=== Machine learning frameworks ===
==== Proprietary machine learning frameworks ====
- Amazon Machine Learning
- Microsoft Azure Machine Learning Studio
- DistBelief (replaced by TensorFlow)

==== Open source machine learning frameworks ====
- Apache Singa
- Apache MXNet
- Caffe
- PyTorch
- mlpack
- TensorFlow
- Torch
- CNTK
- Accord.Net
- Jax
- MLJ.jl – A machine learning framework for Julia

=== Machine learning libraries ===
- Deeplearning4j
- Theano
- scikit-learn
- Keras

=== Machine learning algorithms ===
- AdaBoost
- Almeida–Pineda recurrent backpropagation
- ALOPEX
- Backpropagation
- Bootstrap aggregating
- CN2 algorithm
- Constructing skill trees
- Decision tree learning
- Dehaene–Changeux model
- Diffusion map
- Dominance-based rough set approach
- Dynamic time warping
- Error-driven learning
- Evolutionary multimodal optimization
- Expectation–maximization algorithm
- FastICA
- Forward–backward algorithm
- GeneRec
- Genetic Algorithm for Rule Set Production
- Growing self-organizing map
- Hyper basis function network
- IDistance
- k-means clustering
- k-nearest neighbors algorithm
- Kernel methods for vector output
- Kernel principal component analysis
- Learning vector quantization
- Leabra
- Linde–Buzo–Gray algorithm
- Local outlier factor
- Logic learning machine
- LogitBoost
- Manifold alignment
- Markov chain Monte Carlo (MCMC)
- Minimum redundancy feature selection
- Mixture of experts
- Multiple kernel learning
- Naive Bayes classifier
- Non-negative matrix factorization
- Online machine learning
- Out-of-bag error
- Prefrontal cortex basal ganglia working memory
- PVLV
- Q-learning
- Quadratic unconstrained binary optimization
- Query-level feature
- Quickprop
- Radial basis function network
- Random forest
- Randomized weighted majority algorithm
- Reinforcement learning
- Repeated incremental pruning to produce error reduction (RIPPER)
- Rprop
- Rule-based machine learning
- Self-organizing map
- Skill chaining
- Sparse PCA
- State–action–reward–state–action
- Stochastic gradient descent
- Structured kNN
- Support vector machine
- T-distributed stochastic neighbor embedding
- Temporal difference learning
- Wake-sleep algorithm
- Weighted majority algorithm (machine learning)

== Machine learning methods ==
=== Instance-based algorithm ===
- K-nearest neighbors algorithm (KNN)
- Learning vector quantization (LVQ)
- Self-organizing map (SOM)

=== Regression analysis ===
- Logistic regression
- Ordinary least squares regression (OLSR)
- Linear regression
- Stepwise regression
- Multivariate adaptive regression splines (MARS)
- Regularization algorithm
  - Ridge regression
  - Least Absolute Shrinkage and Selection Operator (LASSO)
  - Elastic net
  - Least-angle regression (LARS)
- Classifiers
  - Probabilistic classifier
    - Naive Bayes classifier
  - Binary classifier
  - Linear classifier
  - Hierarchical classifier

=== Dimensionality reduction ===
Dimensionality reduction

- Canonical correlation analysis (CCA)
- Factor analysis
- Feature extraction
- Feature selection
- Independent component analysis (ICA)
- Linear discriminant analysis (LDA)
- Multidimensional scaling (MDS)
- Non-negative matrix factorization (NMF)
- Partial least squares regression (PLSR)
- Principal component analysis (PCA)
- Principal component regression (PCR)
- Projection pursuit
- Sammon mapping
- t-distributed stochastic neighbor embedding (t-SNE)

=== Ensemble learning ===
Ensemble learning

- AdaBoost
- Boosting
- Bootstrap aggregating (also "bagging" or "bootstrapping")
- Ensemble averaging
- Gradient boosted decision tree (GBDT)
- Gradient boosting
- Random Forest
- Stacked Generalization

=== Meta-learning ===
Meta-learning

- Inductive bias
- Metadata

=== Reinforcement learning ===
Reinforcement learning

- Q-learning
- State–action–reward–state–action (SARSA)
- Temporal difference learning (TD)
- Learning Automata

=== Supervised learning ===
Supervised learning

- Averaged one-dependence estimators (AODE)
- Artificial neural network
- Case-based reasoning
- Gaussian process regression
- Gene expression programming
- Group method of data handling (GMDH)
- Inductive logic programming
- Instance-based learning
- Lazy learning
- Learning Automata
- Learning Vector Quantization
- Logistic Model Tree
- Minimum message length (decision trees, decision graphs, etc.)
  - Nearest Neighbor Algorithm
  - Analogical modeling
- Probably approximately correct learning (PAC) learning
- Ripple down rules, a knowledge acquisition methodology
- Symbolic machine learning algorithms
- Support vector machines
- Random Forests
- Ensembles of classifiers
  - Bootstrap aggregating (bagging)
  - Boosting (meta-algorithm)
- Ordinal classification
- Conditional Random Field
- ANOVA
- Quadratic classifiers
- k-nearest neighbor
- Boosting
  - SPRINT
- Bayesian networks
  - Naive Bayes
- Hidden Markov models
  - Hierarchical hidden Markov model

==== Bayesian ====
Bayesian statistics

- Bayesian knowledge base
- Naive Bayes
- Gaussian Naive Bayes
- Multinomial Naive Bayes
- Averaged One-Dependence Estimators (AODE)
- Bayesian Belief Network (BBN)
- Bayesian Network (BN)

==== Decision tree algorithms ====
Decision tree algorithm

- Decision tree
- Classification and regression tree (CART)
- Iterative Dichotomiser 3 (ID3)
- C4.5 algorithm
- C5.0 algorithm
- Chi-squared Automatic Interaction Detection (CHAID)
- Decision stump
- Conditional decision tree
- ID3 algorithm
- Random forest
- SLIQ

==== Linear classifier ====
Linear classifier

- Fisher's linear discriminant
- Linear regression
- Logistic regression
- Multinomial logistic regression
- Naive Bayes classifier
- Perceptron
- Support vector machine

=== Unsupervised learning ===
Unsupervised learning

- Expectation-maximization algorithm
- Vector Quantization
- Generative topographic map
- Information bottleneck method
- Association rule learning algorithms
  - Apriori algorithm
  - Eclat algorithm

==== Artificial neural networks ====
Artificial neural network

- Feedforward neural network
  - Extreme learning machine
  - Convolutional neural network
- Recurrent neural network
  - Long short-term memory (LSTM)
- Logic learning machine
- Self-organizing map

==== Association rule learning ====
Association rule learning

- Apriori algorithm
- Eclat algorithm
- FP-growth algorithm

==== Hierarchical clustering ====
Hierarchical clustering

- Single-linkage clustering
- Conceptual clustering

==== Cluster analysis ====
Cluster analysis

- BIRCH
- DBSCAN
- Expectation–maximization (EM)
- Fuzzy clustering
- Hierarchical clustering
- k-means clustering
- k-medians
- Mean-shift
- OPTICS algorithm

==== Anomaly detection ====
Anomaly detection

- k-nearest neighbors algorithm (k-NN)
- Local outlier factor

=== Semi-supervised learning ===
Semi-supervised learning

- Active learning
- Generative models
- Low-density separation
- Graph-based methods
- Co-training
- Transduction

=== Deep learning ===
Deep learning

- Deep belief networks
- Deep Boltzmann machines
- Deep Convolutional neural networks
- Deep Recurrent neural networks
- Hierarchical temporal memory
- Generative Adversarial Network
  - Style transfer
- Transformer
- Stacked Auto-Encoders

=== Other machine learning methods and problems ===
- Anomaly detection
- Association rules
- Bias-variance dilemma
- Classification
  - Multi-label classification
- Clustering
- Data Pre-processing
- Empirical risk minimization
- Feature engineering
- Feature learning
- Learning to rank
- Occam learning
- Online machine learning
- PAC learning
- Regression
- Reinforcement Learning
- Semi-supervised learning
- Statistical learning
- Structured prediction
  - Graphical models
    - Bayesian network
    - Conditional random field (CRF)
    - Hidden Markov model (HMM)
- Unsupervised learning
- VC theory

== Machine learning research ==
- List of artificial intelligence projects
- List of datasets for machine learning research

== History of machine learning ==
History of machine learning

- Timeline of machine learning

== Machine learning projects ==
Machine learning projects:

- DeepMind
- Google Brain
- OpenAI
- Meta AI
- Hugging Face

== Machine learning organizations ==
=== Machine learning conferences and workshops ===
- Artificial Intelligence and Security (AISec) (co-located workshop with CCS)
- Conference on Neural Information Processing Systems (NIPS)
- ECML PKDD
- International Conference on Machine Learning (ICML)
- ML4ALL (Machine Learning For All)

== Machine learning publications ==
=== Books on machine learning ===
- Mathematics for Machine Learning
- Hands-On Machine Learning Scikit-Learn, Keras, and TensorFlow
- The Hundred-Page Machine Learning Book

=== Machine learning journals ===
- Machine Learning
- Journal of Machine Learning Research (JMLR)
- Neural Computation

== Persons influential in machine learning ==
- Alberto Broggi
- Andrei Knyazev
- Andrew McCallum
- Andrew Ng
- Anuraag Jain
- Armin B. Cremers
- Ayanna Howard
- Barney Pell
- Ben Goertzel
- Ben Taskar
- Bernhard Schölkopf
- Brian D. Ripley
- Christopher G. Atkeson
- Corinna Cortes
- Demis Hassabis
- Douglas Lenat
- Eric Xing
- Ernst Dickmanns
- Geoffrey Hinton
- Hans-Peter Kriegel
- Hartmut Neven
- Heikki Mannila
- Ian Goodfellow
- Jacek M. Zurada
- Jaime Carbonell
- Jeremy Slovak
- Jerome H. Friedman
- John D. Lafferty
- John Platt
- Julie Beth Lovins
- Jürgen Schmidhuber
- Karl Steinbuch
- Katia Sycara
- Leo Breiman
- Lise Getoor
- Luca Maria Gambardella
- Léon Bottou
- Marcus Hutter
- Mehryar Mohri
- Michael Collins
- Michael I. Jordan
- Michael L. Littman
- Nando de Freitas
- Ofer Dekel
- Oren Etzioni
- Pedro Domingos
- Peter Flach
- Pierre Baldi
- Pushmeet Kohli
- Ray Kurzweil
- Rayid Ghani
- Ross Quinlan
- Salvatore J. Stolfo
- Sebastian Thrun
- Selmer Bringsjord
- Sepp Hochreiter
- Shane Legg
- Stephen Muggleton
- Steve Omohundro
- Tom M. Mitchell
- Trevor Hastie
- Vasant Honavar
- Vladimir Vapnik
- Yann LeCun
- Yasuo Matsuyama
- Yoshua Bengio
- Zoubin Ghahramani

== See also ==
- Outline of artificial intelligence
  - Outline of computer vision
  - Outline of deep learning
  - Outline of robotics
- Accuracy paradox
- Action model learning
- Activation function
- Activity recognition
- ADALINE
- Adaptive neuro fuzzy inference system
- Adaptive resonance theory
- Additive smoothing
- Adjusted mutual information
- AIVA
- AIXI
- AlchemyAPI
- AlexNet
- Algorithm selection
- Algorithmic inference
- Algorithmic learning theory
- AlphaGo
- AlphaGo Zero
- Alternating decision tree
- Apprenticeship learning
- Causal Markov condition
- Competitive learning
- Concept learning
- Decision tree learning
- Differentiable programming
- Distribution learning theory
- Eager learning
- End-to-end reinforcement learning
- Error tolerance (PAC learning)
- Explanation-based learning
- Feature
- GloVe
- Hyperparameter
- Inferential theory of learning
- Learning automata
- Learning classifier system
- Learning rule
- Learning with errors
- M-Theory (learning framework)
- Machine learning control
- Machine learning in bioinformatics
- Margin
- Markov chain geostatistics
- Markov chain Monte Carlo (MCMC)
- Markov information source
- Markov logic network
- Markov model
- Markov random field
- Markovian discrimination
- Maximum-entropy Markov model
- Multi-armed bandit
- Multi-task learning
- Multilinear subspace learning
- Multimodal learning
- Multiple instance learning
- Multiple-instance learning
- Never-Ending Language Learning
- Offline learning
- Parity learning
- Population-based incremental learning
- Predictive learning
- Preference learning
- Proactive learning
- Proximal gradient methods for learning
- Semantic analysis
- Similarity learning
- Sparse dictionary learning
- Stability (learning theory)
- Statistical learning theory
- Statistical relational learning
- Tanagra
- Transfer learning
- Variable-order Markov model
- Version space learning
- Waffles
- Weka
- Loss function
  - Loss functions for classification
  - Mean squared error (MSE)
  - Mean squared prediction error (MSPE)
  - Taguchi loss function
- Low-energy adaptive clustering hierarchy

=== Other ===
- Anne O'Tate
- Ant colony optimization algorithms
- Anthony Levandowski
- Anti-unification (computer science)
- Apache Flume
- Apache Giraph
- Apache Mahout
- Apache SINGA
- Apache Spark
- Apache SystemML
- Aphelion (software)
- Arabic Speech Corpus
- Archetypal analysis
- Arthur Zimek
- Artificial ants
- Artificial bee colony algorithm
- Artificial development
- Artificial immune system
- Astrostatistics
- Averaged one-dependence estimators
- Bag-of-words model
- Balanced clustering
- Ball tree
- Base rate
- Bat algorithm
- Baum–Welch algorithm
- Bayesian hierarchical modeling
- Bayesian interpretation of kernel regularization
- Bayesian optimization
- Bayesian structural time series
- Bees algorithm
- Behavioral clustering
- Bernoulli scheme
- Bias–variance tradeoff
- Biclustering
- BigML
- Binary classification
- Bing Predicts
- Bio-inspired computing
- Biogeography-based optimization
- Biplot
- Bondy's theorem
- Bongard problem
- Bradley–Terry model
- BrownBoost
- Brown clustering
- Burst error
- CBCL (MIT)
- CIML community portal
- CMA-ES
- CURE data clustering algorithm
- Cache language model
- Calibration (statistics)
- Canonical correspondence analysis
- Canopy clustering algorithm
- Cascading classifiers
- Category utility
- CellCognition
- Cellular evolutionary algorithm
- Chi-square automatic interaction detection
- Chromosome (genetic algorithm)
- Classifier chains
- Cleverbot
- Clonal selection algorithm
- Cluster-weighted modeling
- Clustering high-dimensional data
- Clustering illusion
- CoBoosting
- Cobweb (clustering)
- Cognitive computer
- Cognitive robotics
- Collostructional analysis
- Common-method variance
- Complete-linkage clustering
- Computer-automated design
- Concept class
- Concept drift
- Conference on Artificial General Intelligence
- Conference on Knowledge Discovery and Data Mining
- Confirmatory factor analysis
- Confusion matrix
- Congruence coefficient
- Connect (computer system)
- Consensus clustering
- Constrained clustering
- Constrained conditional model
- Constructive cooperative coevolution
- Correlation clustering
- Correspondence analysis
- Coupled pattern learner
- Cross-entropy method
- Cross-validation (statistics)
- Crossover (genetic algorithm)
- Cuckoo search
- Cultural algorithm
- Cultural consensus theory
- Curse of dimensionality
- DADiSP
- DARPA LAGR Program
- Darkforest
- Dartmouth workshop
- DarwinTunes
- Data Mining Extensions
- Data exploration
- Data pre-processing
- Data stream clustering
- Dataiku
- Davies–Bouldin index
- Decision boundary
- Decision list
- Decision tree model
- Deductive classifier
- DeepArt
- DeepDream
- Deep Web Technologies
- Defining length
- Dendrogram
- Dependability state model
- Detailed balance
- Determining the number of clusters in a data set
- Detrended correspondence analysis
- Developmental robotics
- Diffbot
- Differential evolution
- Discrete phase-type distribution
- Discriminative model
- Dissociated press
- Distributed R
- Dlib
- Document classification
- Documenting Hate
- Domain adaptation
- Doubly stochastic model
- Dual-phase evolution
- Dunn index
- Dynamic Bayesian network
- Dynamic Markov compression
- Dynamic topic model
- Dynamic unobserved effects model
- EDLUT
- ELKI
- Edge recombination operator
- Effective fitness
- Elastic map
- Elastic matching
- Elbow method (clustering)
- Emergent (software)
- Encog
- Entropy rate
- Erkki Oja
- Eurisko
- European Conference on Artificial Intelligence
- Evaluation of binary classifiers
- Evolution strategy
- Evolution window
- Evolutionary Algorithm for Landmark Detection
- Evolutionary algorithm
- Evolutionary art
- Evolutionary music
- Evolutionary programming
- Evolvability (computer science)
- Evolved antenna
- Evolver (software)
- Evolving classification function
- Expectation propagation
- Exploratory factor analysis
- F1 score
- FLAME clustering
- Factor analysis of mixed data
- Factor graph
- Factor regression model
- Factored language model
- Farthest-first traversal
- Fast-and-frugal trees
- Feature Selection Toolbox
- Feature hashing
- Feature scaling
- Feature vector
- Firefly algorithm
- First-difference estimator
- First-order inductive learner
- Fish School Search
- Fisher kernel
- Fitness approximation
- Fitness function
- Fitness proportionate selection
- Fluentd
- Folding@home
- Formal concept analysis
- Forward algorithm
- Fowlkes–Mallows index
- Frederick Jelinek
- Frrole
- Functional principal component analysis
- GATTO
- GLIMMER
- Gary Bryce Fogel
- Gaussian adaptation
- Gaussian process
- Gaussian process emulator
- Gene prediction
- General Architecture for Text Engineering
- Generalization error
- Generalized canonical correlation
- Generalized filtering
- Generalized iterative scaling
- Generalized multidimensional scaling
- Generative adversarial network
- Generative model
- Genetic algorithm
- Genetic algorithm scheduling
- Genetic algorithms in economics
- Genetic fuzzy systems
- Genetic memory (computer science)
- Genetic operator
- Genetic programming
- Genetic representation
- Geographical cluster
- Gesture Description Language
- Geworkbench
- Glossary of artificial intelligence
- Glottochronology
- Golem (ILP)
- Google matrix
- Grafting (decision trees)
- Gramian matrix
- Grammatical evolution
- Granular computing
- GraphLab
- Graph kernel
- Gremlin (programming language)
- Growth function
- HUMANT (HUManoid ANT) algorithm
- Hammersley–Clifford theorem
- Harmony search
- Hebbian theory
- Hidden Markov random field
- Hidden semi-Markov model
- Hierarchical hidden Markov model
- Higher-order factor analysis
- Highway network
- Hinge loss
- Holland's schema theorem
- Hopkins statistic
- Hoshen–Kopelman algorithm
- Huber loss
- IRCF360
- Ian Goodfellow
- Ilastik
- Ilya Sutskever
- Immunocomputing
- Imperialist competitive algorithm
- Inauthentic text
- Incremental decision tree
- Induction of regular languages
- Inductive bias
- Inductive probability
- Inductive programming
- Influence diagram
- Information Harvesting
- Information gain in decision trees
- Information gain ratio
- Inheritance (genetic algorithm)
- Instance selection
- Intel RealSense
- Interacting particle system
- Interactive machine translation
- International Joint Conference on Artificial Intelligence
- International Meeting on Computational Intelligence Methods for Bioinformatics and Biostatistics
- International Semantic Web Conference
- Iris flower data set
- Island algorithm
- Isotropic position
- Item response theory
- Iterative Viterbi decoding
- JOONE
- Jabberwacky
- Jaccard index
- Jackknife variance estimates for random forest
- Java Grammatical Evolution
- Joseph Nechvatal
- Jubatus
- Julia (programming language)
- Junction tree algorithm
- k-SVD
- k-means++
- k-medians clustering
- k-medoids
- KNIME
- KXEN Inc.
- k q-flats
- Kaggle
- Kalman filter
- Katz's back-off model
- Kernel adaptive filter
- Kernel density estimation
- Kernel eigenvoice
- Kernel embedding of distributions
- Kernel method
- Kernel perceptron
- Kernel random forest
- Kinect
- Klaus-Robert Müller
- Kneser–Ney smoothing
- Knowledge Vault
- Knowledge integration
- LIBSVM
- LPBoost
- Labeled data
- LanguageWare
- Language identification in the limit
- Language model
- Large margin nearest neighbor
- Latent Dirichlet allocation
- Latent class model
- Latent semantic analysis
- Latent variable
- Latent variable model
- Lattice Miner
- Layered hidden Markov model
- Learnable function class
- Least squares support vector machine
- Leslie P. Kaelbling
- Linear genetic programming
- Linear predictor function
- Linear separability
- Linkurious
- Lior Ron (business executive)
- List of genetic algorithm applications
- List of metaphor-based metaheuristics
- List of text mining software
- Local case-control sampling
- Local independence
- Local tangent space alignment
- Locality-sensitive hashing
- Log-linear model
- Logistic model tree
- Low-rank approximation
- Low-rank matrix approximations
- MATLAB
- MIMIC (immunology)
- MXNet
- Mallet (software project)
- Manifold regularization
- Margin-infused relaxed algorithm
- Margin classifier
- Mark V. Shaney
- Massive Online Analysis
- Matrix regularization
- Matthews correlation coefficient
- Mean shift
- Mean squared error
- Mean squared prediction error
- Measurement invariance
- Medoid
- MeeMix
- Melomics
- Memetic algorithm
- Meta-optimization
- Mexican International Conference on Artificial Intelligence
- Michael Kearns (computer scientist)
- MinHash
- Mixture model
- Mlpy
- Models of DNA evolution
- Moral graph
- Mountain car problem
- Movidius
- Multi-armed bandit
- Multi-label classification
- Multi expression programming
- Multiclass classification
- Multidimensional analysis
- Multifactor dimensionality reduction
- Multilinear principal component analysis
- Multiple correspondence analysis
- Multiple discriminant analysis
- Multiple factor analysis
- Multiple sequence alignment
- Multiplicative weight update method
- Multispectral pattern recognition
- Mutation (genetic algorithm)
- N-gram
- NOMINATE (scaling method)
- Native-language identification
- Natural Language Toolkit
- Natural evolution strategy
- Nearest-neighbor chain algorithm
- Nearest centroid classifier
- Nearest neighbor search
- Neighbor joining
- Nest Labs
- NetMiner
- NetOwl
- Neural Designer
- Neural Engineering Object
- Neural modeling fields
- Neural network software
- NeuroSolutions
- Neuroevolution
- Neuroph
- Niki.ai
- Noisy channel model
- Noisy text analytics
- Nonlinear dimensionality reduction
- Novelty detection
- Nuisance variable
- One-class classification
- Onnx
- OpenNLP
- Optimal discriminant analysis
- Oracle Data Mining
- Orange (software)
- Ordination (statistics)
- Overfitting
- PROGOL
- PSIPRED
- Pachinko allocation
- PageRank
- Parallel metaheuristic
- Parity benchmark
- Part-of-speech tagging
- Particle swarm optimization
- Path dependence
- Pattern language (formal languages)
- Peltarion Synapse
- Perplexity
- Persian Speech Corpus
- Pietro Perona
- Pipeline Pilot
- Piranha (software)
- Pitman–Yor process
- Plate notation
- Polynomial kernel
- Pop music automation
- Population process
- Portable Format for Analytics
- Predictive Model Markup Language
- Predictive state representation
- Preference regression
- Premature convergence
- Principal geodesic analysis
- Prior knowledge for pattern recognition
- Prisma (app)
- Probabilistic Action Cores
- Probabilistic context-free grammar
- Probabilistic latent semantic analysis
- Probabilistic soft logic
- Probability matching
- Probit model
- Product of experts
- Programming with Big Data in R
- Proper generalized decomposition
- Pruning (decision trees)
- Pushpak Bhattacharyya
- Q methodology
- Qloo
- Quality control and genetic algorithms
- Quantum Artificial Intelligence Lab
- Queueing theory
- Quick, Draw!
- R (programming language)
- Rada Mihalcea
- Rademacher complexity
- Radial basis function kernel
- Rand index
- Random indexing
- Random projection
- Random subspace method
- Ranking SVM
- RapidMiner
- Rattle GUI
- Raymond Cattell
- Reasoning system
- Regularization perspectives on support vector machines
- Relational data mining
- Relationship square
- Relevance vector machine
- Relief (feature selection)
- Renjin
- Repertory grid
- Representer theorem
- Reward-based selection
- Richard Zemel
- Right to explanation
- RoboEarth
- Robust principal component analysis
- RuleML Symposium
- Rule induction
- Rules extraction system family
- SAS (software)
- SNNS
- SPSS Modeler
- SUBCLU
- Sample complexity
- Sample exclusion dimension
- Santa Fe Trail problem
- Savi Technology
- Schema (genetic algorithms)
- Search-based software engineering
- Selection (genetic algorithm)
- Self-Service Semantic Suite
- Semantic folding
- Semantic mapping (statistics)
- Semidefinite embedding
- Sense Networks
- Sensorium Project
- Sequence labeling
- Sequential minimal optimization
- Shattered set
- Shogun (toolbox)
- Silhouette (clustering)
- SimHash
- SimRank
- Similarity measure
- Simple matching coefficient
- Simultaneous localization and mapping
- Sinkov statistic
- Sliced inverse regression
- Snakes and Ladders
- Soft independent modelling of class analogies
- Soft output Viterbi algorithm
- Solomonoff's theory of inductive inference
- SolveIT Software
- Spectral clustering
- Spike-and-slab variable selection
- Statistical machine translation
- Statistical parsing
- Statistical semantics
- Stefano Soatto
- Stephen Wolfram
- Stochastic block model
- Stochastic cellular automaton
- Stochastic diffusion search
- Stochastic grammar
- Stochastic matrix
- Stochastic universal sampling
- Stress majorization
- String kernel
- Structural equation modeling
- Structural risk minimization
- Structured sparsity regularization
- Structured support vector machine
- Subclass reachability
- Sufficient dimension reduction
- Sukhotin's algorithm
- Sum of absolute differences
- Sum of absolute transformed differences
- Swarm intelligence
- Switching Kalman filter
- Symbolic regression
- Synchronous context-free grammar
- Syntactic pattern recognition
- TD-Gammon
- TIMIT
- Teaching dimension
- Teuvo Kohonen
- Textual case-based reasoning
- Theory of conjoint measurement
- Thomas G. Dietterich
- Thurstonian model
- Topic model
- Tournament selection
- Training, test, and validation sets
- Transiogram
- Trax Image Recognition
- Trigram tagger
- Truncation selection
- Tucker decomposition
- UIMA
- UPGMA
- Ugly duckling theorem
- Uncertain data
- Uniform convergence in probability
- Unique negative dimension
- Universal portfolio algorithm
- User behavior analytics
- VC dimension
- VIGRA
- Validation set
- Vapnik–Chervonenkis theory
- Variable-order Bayesian network
- Variable kernel density estimation
- Variable rules analysis
- Variational message passing
- Varimax rotation
- Vector quantization
- Vicarious (company)
- Viterbi algorithm
- Vowpal Wabbit
- WACA clustering algorithm
- WPGMA
- Ward's method
- Weasel program
- Whitening transformation
- Winnow (algorithm)
- Win–stay, lose–switch
- Witness set
- Wolfram Language
- Wolfram Mathematica
- Writer invariant
- Xgboost
- Zeroth (software)
