= KXEN =

KXEN may refer to:

- KXEN (AM), a radio station (1010 AM) licensed to St. Louis, Missouri, United States
- KXEN Inc., a California software company
