= LLM (disambiguation) =

LLM, or large language model, is a type of machine learning model designed for natural language processing tasks, especially language generation.

LLM or llm may also refer to:

- LLM, an abbreviation for the Malaysian Highway Authority (Malay: Lembaga Lebuhraya Malaysia)
  - LLM Lettering, a typeface developed by this agency
- LLM Communications, a defunct lobbying firm in the United Kingdom
- LL.M., an abbreviation for a Master of Laws (Latin: Legum Magister), a postgraduate degree
- Logic learning machine, a machine learning method
- Lasalimu language (ISO 639-3 code: llm)
- Lomlom Airport (IATA code: LLM)

== See also ==
- LL (disambiguation)
- LM (disambiguation)
