= Ofer Dekel (researcher) =

- עופר דקל
- Born: Israel
- Education: Hebrew University of Jerusalem
- Scientific career
- Fields: Machine learning, statistical learning theory, online prediction, optimization, web search, and stochastic optimization
- Workplaces: Microsoft Research; University of Washington

Ofer Dekel (Hebrew: עופר דקל) is a computer science researcher in the Machine Learning Department of Microsoft Research. He obtained his PhD in computer science from the Hebrew University of Jerusalem and is an affiliate faculty at the Computer Science & Engineering department at the University of Washington.

== Areas of research ==
Dekel's research topics include machine learning, online prediction, statistical learning theory, and stochastic optimization. He is currently engaged in the application of machine learning techniques in the development of the Bing search engine.

== Bibliography ==
=== h-index ===
As of September 2013, Ofer Dekel has an h-index of approximately 18, above the mean for computer scientists.

=== Highly cited publications ===
Below is a select list of publications in descending order of citations

- Crammer, Koby; Dekel, Ofer; Keshet, Joseph; Shalev-shwartz, Shai; Singer, Yoram (2006). "Online Passive-Aggressive Algorithms". Journal of Machine Learning Research. 7: 551–585.
- Dekel, Ofer; Manning, Christopher; Singer, Yoram (2003). Log-Linear Models for Label Ranking (PDF). Neural Information Processing Systems.
- Dekel, Ofer; Keshet, Joseph; Singer, Yoram (2004). Large margin hierarchical classification. International Conference on Machine Learning. doi:10.1145/1015330.1015374.
- Dekel, Ofer; Shalev-Shwartz, Shai; Singer, Yoram (2008). "The forgetron: A kernel-based perceptron on a budget". SIAM Journal on Computing. 37 (5): 1342–1372. CiteSeerX 10.1.1.115.568. doi:10.1137/060666998. (subscription required)
- Dekel, Ofer; Shamir, Ohad (2009). Vox populi: Collecting high-quality labels from a crowd. COLT 2009. PASCAL - Pattern Analysis, Statistical Modelling and Computational Learning. Archived from the original on 2012-06-26.
- Dekel, Ofer; Fischer, Felix; Procaccia, Ariel D. (December 2010). "Incentive compatible regression learning". Journal of Computer and System Sciences. 76 (8): 759–777. doi:10.1016/j.jcss.2010.03.003. S2CID 141455.
- Dekel, Ofer; Keshet, Joseph; Singer, Yoram (2005). "An online algorithm for hierarchical phoneme classification". Machine Learning for Multimodal Interaction. Lecture Notes in Computer Science. Vol. 3361. Springer. pp. 146–158. CiteSeerX 10.1.1.108.8522. doi:10.1007/978-3-540-30568-2_13. ISBN 978-3-540-30568-2. OCLC 108716892. (subscription required)
- Dekel, Ofer; Shamir, Ohad; Xiao, Lin (November 2010). "Learning to classify with missing and corrupted features". Machine learning. 81 (2): 149–178. CiteSeerX 10.1.1.187.8865. doi:10.1007/s10994-009-5124-8. S2CID 259138.
- Dekel, Ofer; Gilad-Bachrach, Ran; Shamir, Ohad; Xiao, Lin (January 2012). "Optimal distributed online prediction using mini-batches". Journal of Machine Learning Research. 13 (1). Association for Computing Machinery: 165–202.

== See also ==
- Bing
- Jubatus
- Machine learning
- Statistical learning theory
- Stochastic optimization
