= Probabilistic Action Cores =

Natural-language understanding software

PRAC
- Version: 1.1.2
- Framework: Python
- Type: Natural-language instruction interpreter
- License: BSD
- Lead Developer: Daniel Nyga
- Institute: Institute for Artificial Intelligence, University of Bremen
- Website: http://www.actioncores.org

PRAC (Probabilistic Action Cores) is an interpreter for natural-language instructions for robotic applications developed at the Institute for Artificial Intelligence at the University of Bremen, Germany, and is supported in parts by the European Commission and the German Research Foundation (DFG).

== Goals ==
The ultimate goal of the PRAC system is to make knowledge about everyday activities from websites like wikiHow available for service robots, such that they can autonomously acquire new high-level skills by browsing the Web. PRAC addresses the problem that natural language is inherently vague and unspecific. To this end, PRAC maintains probabilistic first-order knowledge bases over semantic networks represented in Markov logic networks. As opposed to other semantic learning initiatives like NELL or IBM's Watson, PRAC does not aim at answering questions in natural language, but to disambiguate and infer information pieces that are missing in natural-language instructions, such that they can be executed by a robot. "This problem formulation is substantially different to the problem of text understanding for question answering or machine translation. In those reasoning tasks, the vagueness and ambiguity of natural-language expressions can often be kept and translated into other languages. In contrast, robotic agents have to infer missing information pieces and disambiguate the meaning of the instruction in order to perform the instruction successfully." In addition to probabilistic relational models, PRAC uses the principles of analogical reasoning and instance-based learning to infer completions of roles in semantic networks.

PRAC has been successfully applied to teach robots to conduct chemical experiments and to make pancakes and pizza from wikiHow articles.
