= Santa Fe Trail problem =

The Santa Fe Trail problem is a genetic programming exercise in which artificial ants search for food pellets according to a programmed set of instructions. The layout of food pellets in the Santa Fe Trail problem has become a standard for comparing different genetic programming algorithms and solutions.

One method for programming and testing algorithms on the Santa Fe Trail problem is by using the NetLogo application. There is at least one case of a student creating a Lego robotic ant to solve the problem.

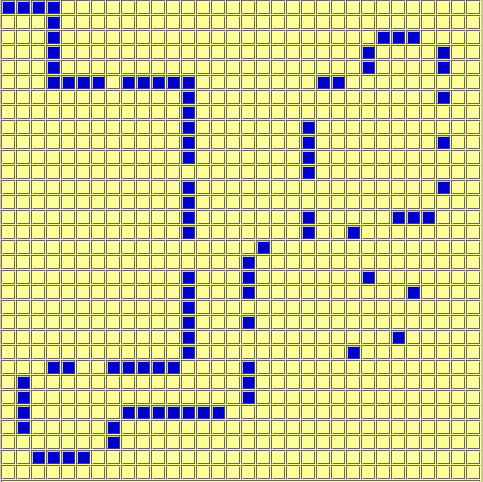
SantaFeTrail

== See also ==
- Genetic programming
- Agent-based model
- Java Grammatical Evolution
