= Persian Speech Corpus =

The Persian Speech Corpus is a Modern Persian speech corpus for speech synthesis. The corpus contains phonetic and orthographic transcriptions of about 2.5 hours of Persian speech aligned with recorded speech on the phoneme level, including annotations of word boundaries. Previous spoken corpora of Persian include FARSDAT, which consists of read aloud speech from newspaper texts from 100 Persian speakers and the Telephone FARsi Spoken language DATabase (TFARSDAT) which comprises seven hours of read and spontaneous speech produced by 60 native speakers of Persian from ten regions of Iran.

The Persian Speech Corpus was built using the same methodologies laid out in the doctoral project on Modern Standard Arabic of Nawar Halabi at the University of Southampton. The work was funded by MicroLinkPC, who own an exclusive license to commercialise the corpus, though the corpus is available for non-commercial use through the corpus' website. It is distributed under the Creative Commons Attribution-NonCommercial-ShareAlike 4.0 International License.

The corpus was built for speech synthesis purposes, but has been used for building HMM based voices in Persian. It can also be used to automatically align other speech corpora with their phonetic transcript and could be used as part of a larger corpus for training speech recognition systems.

== Contents ==
The corpus is downloadable from its website, and contains the following:

- 396 .wav files containing spoken utterances
- 396 .lab files containing text utterances
- 396 .TextGrid files containing the phoneme labels with time stamps of the boundaries where these occur in the .wav files.
- phonetic-transcript.txt which has the form "[wav_filename]" "[Phoneme Sequence]" in every line
- orthographic-transcript.txt which has the form "[wav_filename]" "[Orthographic Transcript]" in every line

== See also ==
- Comparison of datasets in machine learning
