= Unique negative dimension =

Unique negative dimension (UND) is a complexity measure for the model of learning from positive examples. The unique negative dimension of a class $C$ of concepts is the size of the maximum subclass $D\subseteq C$ such that for every concept $c\in D$, we have $\cap (D\setminus \{c\})\setminus c$ is nonempty.

This concept was originally proposed by M. Gereb-Graus in "Complexity of learning from one-side examples", Technical Report TR-20-89, Harvard University Division of Engineering and Applied Science, 1989.

== See also ==
- Computational learning theory
