= Piranha (software) =

Piranha is a text mining system. It was developed for the United States Department of Energy (DOE) by Oak Ridge National Laboratory (ORNL). The software processes free-text documents and shows relationships amongst them, a technique valuable across numerous data domains, from health care fraud to national security. The results are presented in clusters of prioritized relevance. Piranha uses the term frequency/inverse corpus frequency term weighting method which provides strong parallel processing of textual information, thus the ability to analyze large document sets.

Piranha has six main elements:

- Collecting and Extracting: Millions of documents from sources such as databases and social media can be collected and text extracted from hundreds of file formats; This information can be translated to other languages.
- Storing and indexing: Documents in search servers, relational databases, etc. can be stored and indexed.
- Recommending: The system can highlight the most valuable information for specific users.
- Categorizing: Grouping items via supervised and semi-supervised machine learning methods and targeted search lists.
- Clustering: Similarity is used to group documents hierarchically.
- Visualizing: Showing relationships among documents so that users can quickly recognize connections.

This work has resulted in eight patents (9,256,649, 8,825,710, 8,473,314, 7,937,389, 7,805,446, 7,693,9037, 7,315,858, 7,072,883), and commercial licenses (including TextOre and Pro2Serve), a spin-off company with the inventors, Covenant Health, and Pro2Serve called VortexT Analytics, two R&D 100 Awards, and scores of peer reviewed research publications.

== Awards ==
- 2007 R&D 100 Magazine's Award Piranha (software)

== Patents ==
- U.S. patent 7,072,883 – System for gathering and summarizing internet information
- U.S. patent 7,315,858 – Method for gathering and summarizing internet information
- U.S. patent 7,693,903
- U.S. patent 7,805,446 – Agent-based method for distributed clustering of textual information
- U.S. patent 7,937,389 – Dynamic reduction of dimensions of a document vector in a document search and retrieval system
- U.S. patent 8,473,314 – Method and system for determining precursors of health abnormalities from processing medical records
