= Nyström method =

Method of solving integral equations

In mathematics numerical analysis, the Nyström method or quadrature method seeks the numerical solution of an integral equation by replacing the integral with a representative weighted sum. The continuous problem is broken into $n$ discrete intervals; quadrature or numerical integration determines the weights and locations of representative points for the integral.

The problem becomes a system of linear equations with $n$ equations and $n$ unknowns, and the underlying function is implicitly represented by an interpolation using the chosen quadrature rule. This discrete problem may be ill-conditioned, depending on the original problem and the chosen quadrature rule.

Since the linear equations require $O(n^3)$ operations to solve (with default methods such as Gaussian elimination), high-order quadrature rules perform better because low-order quadrature rules require large $n$ for a given accuracy. Gaussian quadrature is normally a good choice for smooth, non-singular problems.

== Discretization of the integral ==
Standard quadrature methods seek to represent an integral as a weighed sum in the following manner:

$$\int_a^b h (x) \;\mathrm d x \approx \sum_{k=1}^n w_k h (x_k)$$

where $w_k$ are the weights of the quadrature rule, and points $x_k$ are the abscissas.

== Example ==
Applying this to the inhomogeneous Fredholm equation of the second kind

$$f (x) = \lambda u (x) - \int_a^b K (x, x') f (x') \;\mathrm d x'$$,

results in

$$f (x) \approx \lambda u (x) - \sum_{k=1}^n w_k K (x, x_k) f (x_k)$$.

== See also ==
- Boundary element method

== Bibliography ==
- Leonard M. Delves & Joan E. Walsh (eds): Numerical Solution of Integral Equations, Clarendon, Oxford, 1974.
- Hans-Jürgen Reinhardt: Analysis of Approximation Methods for Differential and Integral Equations, Springer, New York, 1985.
