= Self-Service Semantic Suite =

- Inventor: Ontotext
- Inception: 2014
- Manufacturer: Ontotext
- Website: http://www.ontotext.com/products/ontotext-s4/

The Self-Service Semantic Suite (S4) provides on-demand access to text mining and linked open data technology in the cloud. The S4 stack is based on enterprise-grade technology from Ontotext including their leading RDF engine (GraphDB, formerly OWLIM) and high performance text mining solutions successfully applied in some of the largest enterprises in the world.

== History ==
It was launched in the summer of 2014.

== Overview ==
S4 offers a suite of text analytics and linked data management in the cloud. You can analyze news, social media, biomedical documents and query Linked Data knowledge graphs. You can also create your own RDF knowledge graphs using GraphDB™.

S4 is low cost, on demand and pay-as-you-go providing affordable, easy access to companies of any size. The RDF triplestore included with S4 is GraphDB™ which is known for scalability and query performance. GraphDB™ is the only triplestore that performs inferencing at scale. Users realize improved query speed, data availability and accurate analysis. With GraphDB it is possible to store, manage and search semantic triples extracted from S4 text mining or to create private Knowledge Graphs integrating structured and unstructured data with facts from public LOD datasets.

== Usability ==
All functionality of the S4 can be accessed via RESTful services. Users are provided with Getting Started guide. Also there is a complete set of documentation and sample code in JAVA, C#, Python and JavaScript.

== Feature Events ==
Presentation 4-5 Dec 2014 - LT-Accelerate Conference - Brussels
