= Kernel eigenvoice =

Speaker adaptation is an important technology to fine-tune either features or speech models for mis-match due to inter-speaker variation. In the last decade, eigenvoice (EV) speaker adaptation has been developed. It makes use of the prior knowledge of training speakers to provide a fast adaptation algorithm (in other words, only a small amount of adaptation data is needed). Inspired by the kernel eigenface idea in face recognition, kernel eigenvoice (KEV) is proposed. KEV is a non-linear generalization to EV. This incorporates Kernel principal component analysis, a non-linear version of Principal Component Analysis, to capture higher order correlations in order to further explore the speaker space and enhance recognition performance.

== See also ==
- fMLLR
