= Hyper basis function network =

In machine learning, a Hyper basis function network, or HyperBF network, is a generalization of radial basis function (RBF) networks concept, where the Mahalanobis-like distance is used instead of the Euclidean distance measure. Hyper basis function networks were first introduced by Poggio and Girosi in the 1990 paper “Networks for Approximation and Learning”.

== Network Architecture ==
The typical HyperBF network structure consists of a real input vector $x\in \mathbb{R}^n$, a hidden layer of activation functions and a linear output layer. The output of the network is a scalar function of the input vector, $\phi: \mathbb{R}^n\to\mathbb{R}$, is given by

$\phi(x)=\sum_{j=1}^{N}a_j\rho_j(||x-\mu_j||)$

where $N$ is a number of neurons in the hidden layer, $\mu_j$ and $a_j$ are the center and weight of neuron $j$. The activation function $\rho_j(||x-\mu_j||)$ at the HyperBF network takes the following form

$\rho_j(||x-\mu_j||)=e^{(x-\mu_j)^T R_j(x-\mu_j)}$

where $R_j$ is a positive definite $d\times d$ matrix. Depending on the application, the following types of matrices $R_j$ are usually considered

- $R_j=\frac{1}{2\sigma^2}\mathbb{I}_{d\times d}$, where $\sigma>0$. This case corresponds to the regular RBF network.
- $R_j=\frac{1}{2\sigma_j^2}\mathbb{I}_{d\times d}$, where $\sigma_j>0$. In this case, the basis functions are radially symmetric, but are scaled with different width.
- $R_j=diag\left(\frac{1}{2\sigma_{j1}^2},...,\frac{1}{2\sigma_{jz}^2}\right)\mathbb{I}_{d\times d}$, where $\sigma_{ji}>0$. Every neuron has an elliptic shape with a varying size.
- Positive definite matrix, but not diagonal.

== Training ==
Training HyperBF networks involves estimation of weights $a_j$, shape and centers of neurons $R_j$ and $\mu_j$. Poggio and Girosi (1990) describe the training method with moving centers and adaptable neuron shapes. The outline of the method is provided below.

Consider the quadratic loss of the network $H[\phi^*]=\sum_{i=1}^{N}(y_i-\phi^* (x_i))^2$. The following conditions must be satisfied at the optimum:

$\frac{\partial H(\phi^*)}{\partial a_j}=0$, $\frac{\partial H(\phi^*)}{\partial \mu_j}=0$, $\frac{\partial H(\phi^*)}{\partial W}=0$

where $R_j=W^TW$. Then in the gradient descent method the values of $a_j, \mu_j, W$ that minimize $H[\phi^*]$ can be found as a stable fixed point of the following dynamic system:

$\dot{a_j}=-\omega\frac{\partial H(\phi^*)}{\partial a_j}$, $\dot{\mu_j}=-\omega\frac{\partial H(\phi^*)}{\partial \mu_j}$, $\dot{W}=-\omega\frac{\partial H(\phi^*)}{\partial W}$

where $\omega$ determines the rate of convergence.

Overall, training HyperBF networks can be computationally challenging. Moreover, the high degree of freedom of HyperBF leads to overfitting and poor generalization. However, HyperBF networks have an important advantage that a small number of neurons is enough for learning complex functions.
