= Effective fitness =

Reproductive success given genetic mutation

In natural evolution and artificial evolution (e.g. artificial life and evolutionary computation) the fitness (or performance or objective measure) of a schema is rescaled to give its effective fitness which takes into account crossover and mutation.

Effective fitness is used in Evolutionary Computation to understand population dynamics. While a biological fitness function only looks at reproductive success, an effective fitness function tries to encompass things that are needed to be fulfilled for survival on population level. In homogeneous populations, reproductive fitness and effective fitness are equal. When a population moves away from homogeneity a higher effective fitness is reached for the recessive genotype. This advantage will decrease while the population moves toward an equilibrium. The deviation from this equilibrium displays how close the population is to achieving a steady state. When this equilibrium is reached, the maximum effective fitness of the population is achieved.

Problem solving with evolutionary computation is realized with a cost function. If cost functions are applied to swarm optimization they are called a fitness function. Strategies like reinforcement learning and NEAT neuroevolution are creating a fitness landscape which describes the reproductive success of cellular automata.

The effective fitness function models the number of fit offspring and is used in calculations that include evolutionary processes, such as mutation and crossover, important on the population level.

The effective fitness model is superior to its predecessor, the standard reproductive fitness model. It advances in the qualitatively and quantitatively understanding of evolutionary concepts like bloat, self-adaptation, and evolutionary robustness. While reproductive fitness only looks at pure selection, effective fitness describes the flow of a population and natural selection by taking genetic operators into account.

A normal fitness function fits to a problem, while an effective fitness function is an assumption if the objective was reached. The difference is important for designing fitness functions with algorithms like novelty search in which the objective of the agents is unknown. In the case of bacteria effective fitness could include production of toxins and rate of mutation of different plasmids, which are mostly stochastically determined

== Applications ==
When evolutionary equations of the studied population dynamics are available, one can algorithmically compute the effective fitness of a given population. Though the perfect effective fitness model is yet to be found, it is already known to be a good framework to the better understanding of the moving of the genotype-phenotype map, population dynamics, and the flow on fitness landscapes.

Models using a combination of Darwinian fitness functions and effective functions are better at predicting population trends. Effective models could be used to determine therapeutic outcomes of disease treatment. Other models could determine effective protein engineering and works towards finding novel or heightened biochemistry.
