= KXEN Inc. =

KXEN
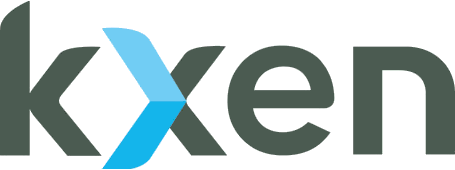
- Developer: KXEN Inc.
- Stable release: 5.1 / May 2009
- Operating system: Windows, Linux, Unix
- Type: Predictive analytics
- License: Proprietary
- Website: kxen.com

KXEN Inc.
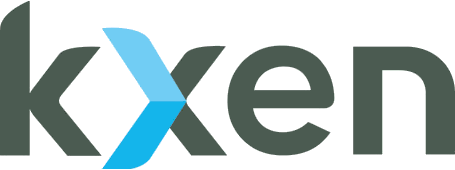
- Type: subsidiary
- Industry: software
- Founded: California (1998)
- Parent: SAP AG

KXEN was an American software company which existed from 1998 to 2013 when it was acquired by SAP AG.

== History ==
KXEN was founded in June 1998 by Roger Haddad and Michel Bera. It was based in San Francisco, California with offices in Paris and London. On September 10, 2013, SAP AG announced plans to acquire KXEN. On October 1, 2013, a letter to KXEN customers announced the acquisition closed.

KXEN primarily marketed predictive analytics software.

== Predictive analytics ==
InfiniteInsight is a predictive modeling suite developed by KXEN that assists analytic professionals, and business executives to extract information from data. Among other functions, InfiniteInsight is used for variable importance, classification, regression, segmentation, time series, product recommendation, as described and expressed by the Java Data Mining interface, and for social network analysis. InfiniteInsight allows prediction of a behavior or a value, the forecast of a time series or the understanding of a group of individuals with similar behavior. Advanced functions include behavioral modeling, exporting the model code into different target environments or building predictive models on top of SAS or SPSS data files. Competitors are SAS Enterprise Miner, IBM SPSS Modeler, and Statistica. Open source predictive tools like the R package or Weka are also competitors, since they provide similar features free of charge.

== See also ==
- Data mining
- Supervised learning
