= Jubatus =

- Developers: Nippon Telegraph and Telephone & Preferred Infrastructure
- Stable release: 0.4.3 / April 19, 2013
- Written in: C++
- Operating system: Linux
- Type: machine learning
- License: GNU Lesser General Public License 2.1
- Website: jubat.us/en/

Jubatus is an open-source online machine learning and distributed computing framework developed at Nippon Telegraph and Telephone and Preferred Infrastructure. Its features include classification, recommendation, regression, anomaly detection and graph mining. It supports many client languages, including C++, Java, Ruby and Python. It uses Iterative Parameter Mixture for distributed machine learning.

== Notable Features ==
Jubatus supports:

- Multi-classification algorithms:
  - Perceptron
  - Passive Aggressive
  - Confidence Weighted
  - Adaptive Regularization of Weight Vectors
  - Normal Herd
- Recommendation algorithms using:
  - Inverted index
  - Minhash
  - Locality-sensitive hashing
- Regression algorithms:
  - Passive Aggressive
- feature extraction method for natural language:
  - n-gram
  - Text segmentation

== See also ==
- Comparison of machine learning software
