= Michael Kearns (computer scientist) =

American computer scientist

Michael Justin Kearns
- Born: California
- Education: University of California at Berkeley (BS, 1985); Harvard University (PhD, 1989)
- Awards: Member of U.S. National Academy of Sciences (2021); Fellow of the American Academy of Arts and Sciences (2012); ACM Fellow (2014); Fellow of the Association for the Advancement of Artificial Intelligence (2003)
- Scientific career
- Workplaces: University of Pennsylvania (2002–); AT&T Bell Labs (1991–2001)
- Thesis: The Computational Complexity of Machine Learning (1989)
- Doctoral advisor: Leslie Valiant
- Other academic advisors: Ronald Rivest (postdoctoral, MIT); Richard M. Karp (postdoctoral, UC Berkeley)
- Doctoral students: Jennifer Wortman Vaughan
- Other notable students: John Langford (postdoctoral visitor)
- Website: www.cis.upenn.edu/~mkearns/

Michael Justin Kearns is an American computer scientist, professor and National Center Chair at the University of Pennsylvania, the founding director of Penn's Singh Program in Networked & Social Systems Engineering (NETS), the founding director of Warren Center for Network and Data Sciences, and also holds secondary appointments in Penn's Wharton School and department of Economics. He is a leading researcher in computational learning theory and algorithmic game theory, and interested in machine learning, artificial intelligence, computational finance, algorithmic trading, computational social science and social networks. He previously led the Advisory and Research function in Morgan Stanley's Artificial Intelligence Center of Excellence team, and is currently an Amazon Scholar within Amazon Web Services.

== Biography ==
Kearns was born into an academic family, where his father David R Kearns is Professor Emeritus at University of California, San Diego in chemistry, who won Guggenheim Fellowship in 1969, and his uncle Thomas R. Kearns is Professor Emeritus at Amherst College in Philosophy and Law, Jurisprudence, and Social Thought. His paternal grandfather Clyde W. Kearns was a pioneer in insecticide toxicology and was a professor at University of Illinois at Urbana–Champaign in Entomology, and his maternal grandfather Chen Shou-Yi (1899–1978) was a professor at Pomona College in history and literature, who was born in Canton (Guangzhou, China) into a family noted for their scholarship and educational leadership.

Kearns received his B.S. degree at the University of California at Berkeley in math and computer science in 1985, and Ph.D. in computer science from Harvard University in 1989, under the supervision of Turing Award winner Leslie Valiant. His doctoral dissertation was The Computational Complexity of Machine Learning, later published by MIT press as part of the ACM Doctoral Dissertation Award Series in 1990. Before joining AT&T Bell Labs in 1991, he continued with postdoctoral positions at the Laboratory for Computer Science at MIT hosted by Ronald Rivest, and at the International Computer Science Institute (ICSI) in UC Berkeley hosted by Richard M. Karp, both of whom are Turing Award winners.

Kearns is currently a full professor and National Center Chair at the University of Pennsylvania, where his appointment is split across the Department of Computer and Information Science, and Statistics and Operations and Information Management in the Wharton School. Prior to joining the Penn faculty in 2002, he spent a decade (1991–2001) in AT&T Labs and Bell Labs, including as head of the AI department with colleagues including Michael L. Littman, David A. McAllester, and Richard S. Sutton; Secure Systems Research department; and Machine Learning department with members such as Michael Collins and the leader Fernando Pereira. Other AT&T Labs colleagues in Algorithms and Theoretical Computer Science included Yoav Freund, Ronald Graham, Mehryar Mohri, Robert Schapire, and Peter Shor, as well as Sebastian Seung, Yann LeCun, Corinna Cortes, and Vladimir Vapnik (the V in VC dimension).

Kearns was named Fellow of the Association for Computing Machinery (2014) for contributions to machine learning, and a fellow of the American Academy of Arts and Sciences (2012).

His former graduate students and postdoctoral visitors include Ryan W. Porter, John Langford, and Jennifer Wortman Vaughan.

Kearns' work has been reported by media, such as MIT Technology Review (2014) Can a Website Help You Decide to Have a Kid?, Bloomberg News (2014) Schneiderman (and Einstein) Pressure High-Speed Trading and NPR audio (2012) Online Education Grows Up, And For Now, It's Free.

== Academic life ==
=== Computational learning theory ===
Kearns and Umesh Vazirani published An introduction to computational learning theory, which has been a standard text on computational learning theory since it was published in 1994.

=== Weak learnability and the origin of Boosting algorithms ===
The question "is weakly learnability equivalent to strong learnability?" posed by Kearns and Valiant (Unpublished manuscript 1988, ACM Symposium on Theory of Computing 1989) is the origin of boosting machine learning algorithms, which got a positive answer by Robert Schapire (1990, proof by construction, not practical) and Yoav Freund (1993, by voting, not practical) and then they developed the practical AdaBoost (European Conference on Computational Learning Theory 1995, Journal of Computer and System Sciences 1997), an adaptive boosting algorithm that won the prestigious Gödel Prize (2003).

== Honors and awards ==
- 2021. Member of the U. S. National Academy of Sciences.
- 2014. ACM Fellow.

For contributions to machine learning, artificial intelligence, and algorithmic game theory and computational social science.

- 2012. American Academy of Arts and Sciences Fellow.

== Selected works ==
- 2019. The Ethical Algorithm: The Science of Socially Aware Algorithm Design. (with Aaron Roth). Oxford University Press.
- 1994. An introduction to computational learning theory. (with Umesh Vazirani). MIT press.

Widely used as a text book in computational learning theory courses.

- The computational complexity of machine learning (PDF). MIT Press. 1990.

Based on his 1989 doctoral dissertation;
ACM Doctoral Dissertation Award Series in 1990

- 1989. Cryptographic limitations on learning Boolean formulae and finite automata. (with Leslie Valiant) Proceedings of the twenty-first annual ACM symposium on Theory of computing (STOC'89).

The open question: is weakly learnability equivalent to strong learnability?;
The origin of boosting algorithms;
Important publication in machine learning.

== See also ==
- Boosting (machine learning)
