= Hierarchical classification =

Hierarchical classification is a system of grouping things according to a hierarchy.

In the field of machine learning, hierarchical classification is sometimes referred to as instance space decomposition, which splits a complete multi-class problem into a set of smaller classification problems.

== See also ==
- Deductive classifier
- Cascading classifiers
- Faceted classification
