= Jennifer Wortman Vaughan =

American computer scientist

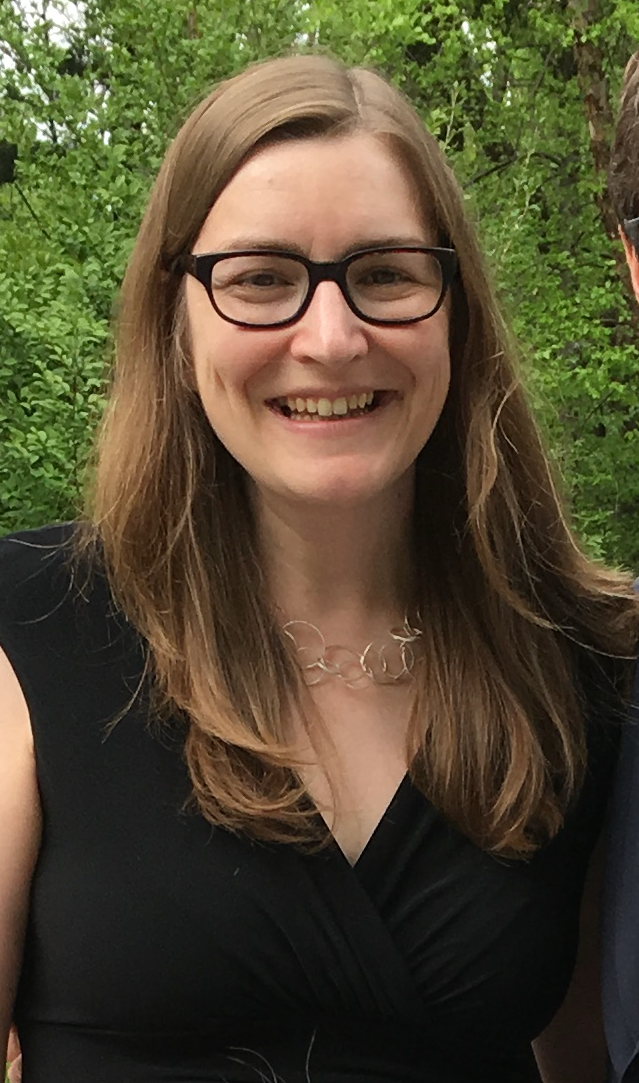
- Jennifer Wortman Vaughan, May 2019
- Education: Boston University; Stanford University; University of Pennsylvania
- Scientific career
- Fields: Computer Science
- Workplaces: Harvard University; University of California, Los Angeles; Microsoft Research
- Website: Personal website

Jennifer (Jenn) Wortman Vaughan is an American computer scientist and Senior Principal Researcher at Microsoft Research focusing mainly on building responsible artificial intelligence (AI) systems as part of Microsoft's Fairness, Accountability, Transparency, and Ethics in AI (FATE) initiative. Jennifer is also a co-chair of Microsoft's Aether group on transparency that works on operationalizing responsible AI across Microsoft through making recommendations on responsible AI issues, technologies, processes, and best practices. Jennifer is also active in the research community, she served as the workshops chair and the program co-chair of the Conference on Neural Information Processing Systems (NeurIPs) in 2019 and 2021, respectively. She currently serves as Steering Committee member of the Association for Computing Machinery Conference on Fairness, Accountability and Transparency. Jennifer is also a senior advisor to Women in Machine Learning (WiML), an initiative co-founded by Jennifer in 2006 aiming to enhance the experience of women in Machine Learning.

== Academic biography ==
Jennifer received a bachelor's degree in Computer Science from Boston University in 2002 and an MS in Computer Science from Stanford University in 2004, where she conducted research for the first time while working with Stanford's Multiagent Group. She received an MSE and PhD in Computer and Information Science from the University of Pennsylvania in 2009 where she was mentored by Michael Kearns. During her time at UPenn, she interned with the Machine Learning and Microeconomics groups at Yahoo! Research, as well as the research group at Google. Her dissertation Learning from collective preferences, behavior, and beliefs introduced new theoretical learning models and algorithms for scenarios in which information is aggregated across a population. After receiving her PhD, she spent a year as a Computing Innovation Fellow at Harvard University, where she was involved with the EconCS group, the Theory of Computation group, and the Center for Research on Computation and Society. Prior to joining Microsoft Research in 2012, Jennifer was an assistant professor of Computer Science at the University of California, Los Angeles.

== Awards and honors ==
- University of Pennsylvania's Morris and Dorothy Rubinoff Award (2009)
- National Science Foundation (NSF)'s Computing Innovation Fellowship (2009)
- 25th Conference on Uncertainty in Artificial Intelligence's Best Student Paper Award (2009)
- NSF's CAREER Award (2011)
- University of California, Los Angeles's Symantec Term Chair in Computer Science (2011)
- Presidential Early Career Award for Scientists and Engineers (PECASE) (2012)
- 24th International World Wide Web Conference's Best Paper Award Nominee (2015)
