= Decision list =

Decision lists are a representation for Boolean functions which can be easily learned from examples. Single term decision lists are more expressive than disjunctions and conjunctions; however, 1-term decision lists are less expressive than the general disjunctive normal form and the conjunctive normal form.

The language specified by a k-length decision list includes as a subset the language specified by a k-depth decision tree.

Learning decision lists can be used for attribute efficient learning, a type of machine learning.

== Definition ==
A decision list (DL) of length r is of the form:

if f1 then 
    output b1
else if f2 then
    output b2
...
else if fr then
    output br

where f_{i} is the ith formula and b_{i} is the ith boolean for $i \in \{1...r\}$. The last if-then-else is the default case, which means formula f_{r} is always equal to true. A k-DL is a decision list where all of formulas have at most k terms. Sometimes "decision list" is used to refer to a 1-DL, where all of the formulas are either a variable or its negation.

== See also ==
- Decision stump
