= Michael Jones (scientist) =

Academic background
- Education: Massachusetts Institute of Technology (PhD)

Academic work
- Discipline: Computer science
- Sub-discipline: Computer vision Machine learning Artificial intelligence Data analytics
- Institutions: Mitsubishi Electric Research Laboratories

Michael J. Jones is an American computer scientist and inventor working as a computer vision researcher at Mitsubishi Electric Research Laboratories.

== Education ==
Jones earned a PhD from the Massachusetts Institute of Technology in 1997 under Tomaso Poggio.

== Career ==
Jones is the co-inventor, with Paul Viola, of the Viola–Jones face detection method, an ICCV 2003 Marr Prize and CVPR Longuet-Higgins Prize winner. In 2026, he was named a fellow of the Institute of Electrical and Electronics Engineers.
