= Robert Schapire =

American computer scientist

Robert Elias Schapire
- Education: Brown University; Massachusetts Institute of Technology
- Known for: AdaBoost
- Awards: Gödel Prize (2003); Paris Kanellakis Award (2004)
- Scientific career
- Fields: Computer science
- Workplaces: Microsoft Research; AT&T Labs; Princeton University
- Thesis: The design and analysis of efficient learning algorithms (1991)
- Doctoral advisor: Ronald Rivest
- Doctoral students: Cynthia Rudin
- Website: http://rob.schapire.net/

Robert Elias Schapire is an American computer scientist renowned for his contributions to machine learning theory and its applications. He was formerly a computer science professor at Princeton University before joining Microsoft Research. His research focuses on theoretical and applied machine learning, with particular emphasis on ensemble learning.

== Career ==
Schapire's most significant contribution to computer science is the development of boosting, a fundamental ensemble learning algorithm that has revolutionized machine learning. His doctoral dissertation, The design and analysis of efficient learning algorithms, earned him the ACM Doctoral Dissertation Award in 1991. In 1996, collaborating with Yoav Freund, he invented the AdaBoost algorithm, a breakthrough that led to their joint receipt of the Gödel Prize in 2003.

Schapire was elected an AAAI Fellow in 2009. In 2014, he was elected a member of the National Academy of Engineering for his contributions to machine learning through the invention and development of boosting algorithms. In 2016, he was elected to the National Academy of Sciences.

== Selected works ==
=== Books ===
- Robert Schapire; Yoav Freund (2012). Boosting: Foundations and Algorithms. MIT. ISBN 978-0-262-01718-3.
