= Margin (machine learning) =

Distance from a data point to a decision boundary

H_{1} does not separate the classes. H_{2} does, but only with a small margin. H_{3} separates them with the maximum margin.

In machine learning, the margin of a data point is a measure of its separation from a classifier's decision boundary. A common distinction is made between the functional margin, defined in terms of the classifier's output, and the geometric margin, defined in terms of distance from the decision boundary. The precise meaning of "margin" therefore depends on the learning algorithm and the convention adopted by a particular source.

A margin classifier is a classification model that utilizes the margin of each example to learn such classification. There are theoretical justifications (based on the VC dimension) as to why maximizing the margin (under some suitable constraints) may be beneficial for machine learning and statistical inference algorithms.

For a given dataset, there may be many hyperplanes that could classify it. One reasonable choice as the best hyperplane is the one that represents the largest separation, or margin, between the classes. Hence, one should choose the hyperplane such that the distance from it to the nearest data point on each side is maximized. If such a hyperplane exists, it is known as the maximum-margin hyperplane, and the linear classifier it defines is known as a maximum margin classifier (or, equivalently, the perceptron of optimal stability).

== See also ==
- Support vector machine
- Statistical classification
- VC dimension
- Hyperplane
- Perceptron
- Maximum margin classifier
- Kernel method
- Decision boundary
