= Paul Viola =

American computer vision researcher

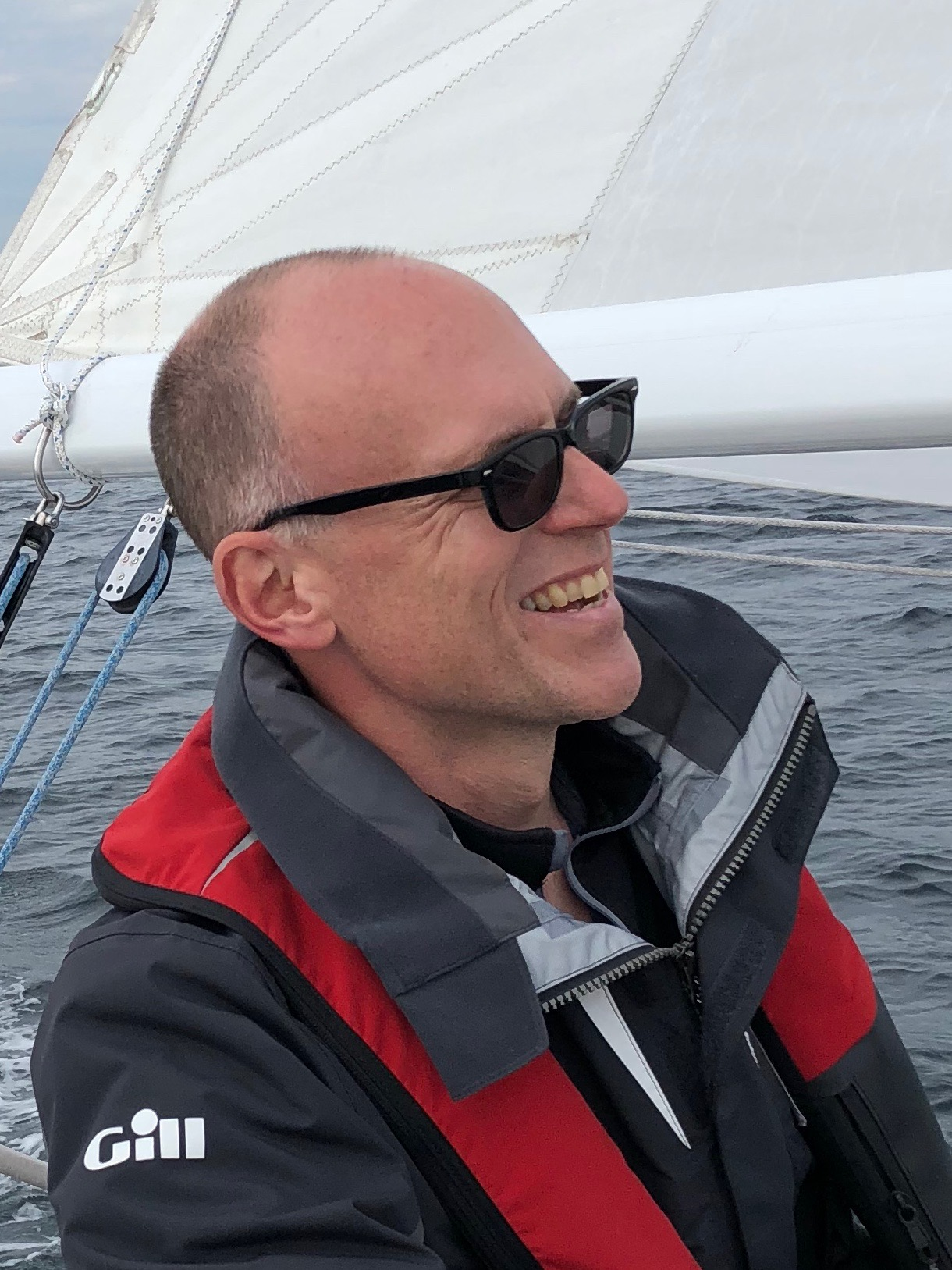
- Born: 22 October 1966 (age 60); New York, New York
- Education: Massachusetts Institute of Technology
- Known for: Computer Vision and Facial Recognition
- Awards: Marr Prize (2003); Longuet-Higgins Prize (2011); ICCV Helmholtz Prize (2013)
- Scientific career
- Fields: Computer Science
- Workplaces: Massachusetts Institute of Technology; Cambridge Research Laboratory (HP, Compaq); Mitsubishi Electric Research Laboratories; Microsoft Research; Amazon Prime Air
- Thesis: Alignment by Maximization of Mutual Information (1995)
- Doctoral advisor: Christopher G. Atkeson; Tomas Lozano-Perez

Paul Viola is a computer vision researcher, and Distinguished Engineer at Zoox. He is a former MIT professor, a former vice president of science for Amazon Prime Air and a former Distinguished Engineer at Microsoft. He is best known for his seminal work in facial recognition and machine learning. He is the co-inventor of the Viola–Jones object detection framework along with Michael Jones. He won the Marr Prize in 2003 and the Helmholtz Prize from the International Conference on Computer Vision in 2013. He is the holder of at least 57 patents in the areas of advanced machine learning, web search, data mining, and image processing. He is the author of more than 50 academic research papers with over 56,000 citations.
