= Yoav Freund =

Israeli-American computer scientist

- יואב פרוינד
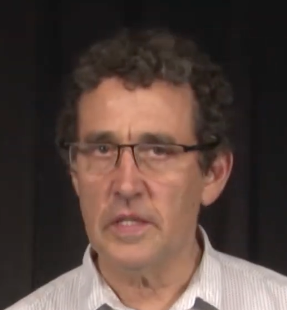
- Freund in 2018
- Born: 1961 (age 64–65)
- Education: The Hebrew University of Jerusalem; University of California, Santa Cruz
- Known for: AdaBoost
- Awards: Gödel Prize (2003)
- Scientific career
- Fields: Computer Science
- Workplaces: University of California San Diego
- Thesis: Data filtering and distribution modeling algorithms for machine learning (1993)
- Doctoral advisor: Manfred K. Warmuth, David Haussler

Yoav Freund (Hebrew: יואב פרוינד; born 1961) is an Israeli professor of computer science at the University of California San Diego who mainly works on machine learning, probability theory and related fields and applications.

He is an alumnus of the Hebrew University High School, of the Hebrew University of Jerusalem and the Talpiot program of the Israeli army. He did his PhD in University of California, Santa Cruz.

He is best known for his work on the AdaBoost algorithm, an ensemble learning algorithm which is used to combine many "weak" learning machines to create a more robust one. He and Robert Schapire received the Gödel Prize in 2003 for their joint work on AdaBoost. In 2004 he was awarded the Paris Kanellakis Award. He was elected an AAAI Fellow in 2008.

== Selected works ==
- Robert Schapire; Yoav Freund (2012). Boosting: Foundations and Algorithms. MIT. ISBN 978-0-262-01718-3.
