= Peter Burmeister =

German mathematician (1941–2019)

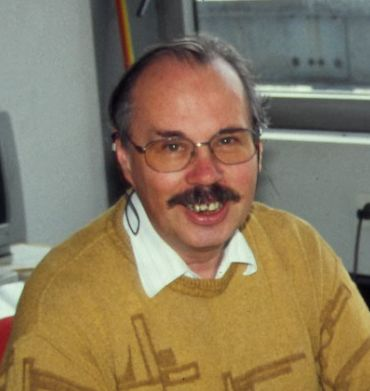
Burmeister in 1996

Peter Burmeister (16 July 1941 – 20 January 2019) was a German mathematician. He was a professor of mathematics at Darmstadt University of Technology. He was born in Berlin, Germany.

Burmeister died on 20 January 2019 in Reinheim, Germany at the age of 77.

== Academic career ==
Peter Burmeister studied mathematics at the Free University of Berlin with an exchange year at the University of Münster. In 1966, he received his PhD from the Rheinische Friedrich-Wilhelms-University Bonn, supervised by Jürgen Schmidt, with a dissertation titled Über die Mächtigkeiten und Unabhängigkeitsgrade der Basen freier Algebren (On the Cardinalities and Independence Degrees of the Bases of Free Algebras). In 1971, he habilitated at the University of Bonn under Wolfram Schwabhäuser with the work Primitive Classes of Partial Algebras. The same year, he was appointed Professor of Mathematics at the Technical University of Darmstadt. He retired in 2004.

== Work ==
Peter Burmeister's research interests focused on Universal algebra, particularly partial algebras. He was also interested in order theory, lattice theory, Formal concept analysis, and conceptual knowledge processing, as well as the foundations of geometry and discrete mathematics, especially graph theory.

His most important publication, according to his own account, is A Model Theoretic Oriented Approach to Partial Algebras with more than 500 pages.

Together with Rudolf Wille, he worked in the Arbeitsgruppe Allgemeine Algebra (General Algebra Group) and the Forschungsgruppe Begriffsanalyse (Concept Analysis Research Group). He was a founding member of the Ernst-Schröder-Center for Conceptual Knowledge Processing e.V. and served on its board.

Building on the algorithm developed by Bernhard Ganter for calculating a concept lattice, Peter Burmeister developed the software ConImp (Contexts & Implications). This software allows for the editing and evaluation of formal contexts, particularly through the computation of the canonical basis and feature exploration – even with incomplete knowledge. Insights for this work came from Burmeister's doctoral student Richard Holzer, who developed the dissertation Methoden der formalen Begriffsanalyse bei der Behandlung unvollständigen Wissens (Methods of Formal Concept Analysis for Handling Incomplete Knowledge).
