= General Concept Lattice =

Model of concept hierarchies

Fig. 1: Three different formal concept lattices (FCLs) obtained from the three formal contexts describing the same 3BS, where balls are equipped with three distinct colours.

The General Concept Lattice (GCL) proposes a novel general construction of concept hierarchy from formal context, where the conventional Formal Concept Lattice based on Formal Concept Analysis (FCA) only serves as a substructure.

The formal context is a data table of heterogeneous relations illustrating how objects carrying attributes. By analogy with truth-value table, every formal context can develop its fully extended version including all the columns corresponding to attributes constructed, by means of Boolean operations, out of the given attribute set. The GCL is based on the extended formal context which comprehends the full information content of formal context in the sense that it incorporates whatever the formal context should consistently imply. Noteworthily, different formal contexts may give rise to the same extended formal context.

== Background ==
The GCL claims to take into account the extended formal context for preservation of information content. Consider describing a three-ball system (3BS) with three distinct colours, e.g., $a:=$red, $b:=$green and $c:=$blue. According to Table 1, one may refer to different attribute sets, say, $M=\{a,b,c \}$, $M_1=\{a\ {\bf or}\ b, b\ {\bf or}\ c,c \ {\bf or}\ a \}$ or $M_2=\{a\ {\bf or}\ b, b\ {\bf or}\ c,c \}$ to reach different formal contexts. The concept hierarchy for the 3BS is supposed to be unique regardless of how the 3BS being described. However, the FCA exhibits different formal concept lattices subject to the chosen formal contexts for the 3BS , see Fig. 1. In contrast, the GCL is an invariant lattice structure with respect to these formal contexts since they can infer each other and ultimately entail the same information content.

Table 1: The extended version for the formal context describing the 3BS. From $F_1(G,M_1)$ one can also deduce $F_{\scriptscriptstyle 3BS} (G,M)$, thereby deducing the full $F_{\scriptscriptstyle 3BS}^\ast (G,M^\ast)$. Note that $a\neg b\neg c=(a+b)\neg (b+c)(c+a)$,$\neg a b\neg c=(a+b)(b+c)\neg (c+a)$, $\neg a \neg b c= \neg (a+b)(b+c) (c+a)$.
	$F_{\scriptscriptstyle 3BS} (G,M)$			$F_1(G,M_1)$			$\quad 250 \mbox{ more columns }$				
$M^\ast$ $G$	$a$	$b$	$c$	$a+b$	$b+c$	$c+a$	$\neg a+b$	$\neg c$	$\ldots$	${\quad }$	$\ldots$
1	$\times$			$\times$		$\times$		$\times$			
2		$\times$		$\times$	$\times$		$\times$	$\times$			
3			$\times$		$\times$	$\times$	$\times$				

In information science, the Formal Concept Analysis (FCA) promises practical applications in various fields based on the following fundamental characteristics.

- It orders the formal concepts in a hierarchy i.e. the formal concept lattice (FCL) which can be visualized as a line diagram that may be helpful for understanding the data.
- It enables the attribute exploration, a knowledge acquisition technique based on implications. It is possible to acquire the canonical (Guigues-Duquenne) basis, the non-redundant collection of informative implications based on which valid implications available from the formal context can be derived by the Armstrong rules.

The FCL does not appear to be the only lattice applicable to the interpretation of data table. Alternative concept lattices subject to different derivation operators based on the notions relevant to the Rough Set Analysis have also been proposed. Specifically, the object-oriented concept lattice, which is referred to as the rough set lattice (RSL) afterwards, is found to be particularly instructive to supplement the standard FCA in further understandings of the formal context.

- The FCL exhibits the categorisation for object class according to their common properties while the RSL is according to those properties which other classes do not possess.
- The RSL provides an alternative scheme for implications available from the formal context which are beyond the scope of FCL, as will be clarified later.

Consequently, there are two crucial points to be contemplated.

- The FCL and RSL reflect different concept hierarchies interpreting the same formal context in a complementary way. However, similar to the case of FCL, RSL also suffers from different lattice structures varying with respect to the chosen formal contexts, see Fig. 2.
- The implication relations extracted via the RSL from the formal context signify a different part of logic content from the ones extractable via the FCL. The treatment via the RSL would require further efforts of construction, the Guigues-Duquenne basis for the RSL. Moreover, it is unwarranted that the implications of these two together suffices the full logic content.
  Fig. 2: Three different rough set lattices, cf. Fig. 1, obtained from the same three formal contexts describing the 3BS.

The GCL accomplishes a sound theoretical foundation for the concept hierarchies acquired from formal context. Maintaining the generality that preserves the information, the GCL underlies both the FCL and RSL, which correspond to substructures at particular restrictions. Technically, the GCL would be reduced to the FCL and RSL when restricted to conjunctions and disjunctions of elements in the referred attribute set ($M$), respectively. In addition, the GCL unveils extra information complementary to the results via the FCL and RSL. Surprisingly, the implementation of formal context via GCL is much more manageable than those via FCL and RSL.

== Related mathematical formulations ==
=== Algebras of derivation operators ===
The derivation operators constitute the building blocks of concept lattices and thus deserve distinctive notations. Subject to a formal context concerning the object set $G$ and attribute set $M$,

  
    
      
        I
         
        :
         
        
          
            
              
                X
                ⊆
                G
                ↦
                 
                
                  X
                  
                    I
                  
                
                =
                {
                m
                ∈
                M
                ∣
                g
                R
                m
                ,
                 
                ∀
                g
                ∈
                X
                }
                ⊆
                M
              
            
            
              
                Y
                ⊆
                M
                ↦
                 
                
                  Y
                  
                    I
                  
                
                =
                {
                g
                ∈
                G
                ∣
                g
                R
                m
                ,
                 
                ∀
                m
                ∈
                Y
                }
                ⊆
                G
              
            
          
        
        ,
      
    
    {\displaystyle I\ :\ {\begin{array}{l}X\subseteq G\mapsto \ X^{I}=\lbrace m\in M\mid gRm,\ \forall g\in X\rbrace \subseteq M\\Y\subseteq M\mapsto \ Y^{I}=\lbrace g\in G\mid gRm,\ \forall m\in Y\rbrace \subseteq G\end{array}},}
  

  
    
      
        ◻
         
        :
         
        
          
            
              
                X
                ⊆
                G
                ↦
                 
                
                  X
                  
                    ◻
                  
                
                =
                {
                m
                ∈
                M
                ∣
                ∀
                g
                ∈
                G
                ,
                g
                R
                m
                
                ⟹
                
                g
                ∈
                X
                }
                ⊆
                M
              
            
            
              
                Y
                ⊆
                M
                ↦
                 
                
                  Y
                  
                    ◻
                  
                
                =
                {
                g
                ∈
                G
                ∣
                ∀
                m
                ∈
                M
                ,
                g
                R
                m
                
                ⟹
                
                m
                ∈
                Y
                }
                ⊆
                G
              
            
          
        
        ,
      
    
    {\displaystyle \Box \ :\ {\begin{array}{l}X\subseteq G\mapsto \ X^{\Box }=\lbrace m\in M\mid \forall g\in G,gRm\implies g\in X\rbrace \subseteq M\\Y\subseteq M\mapsto \ Y^{\Box }=\lbrace g\in G\mid \forall m\in M,gRm\implies m\in Y\rbrace \subseteq G\end{array}},}
  

  
    
      
        ◊
         
        :
         
        
          
            
              
                X
                ⊆
                G
                ↦
                 
                
                  X
                  
                    ◊
                  
                
                =
                {
                m
                ∈
                M
                ∣
                ∃
                g
                ∈
                G
                ,
                (
                g
                R
                m
                ,
                 
                g
                ∈
                X
                )
                }
                ⊆
                M
              
            
            
              
                Y
                ⊆
                M
                ↦
                 
                
                  Y
                  
                    ◊
                  
                
                =
                {
                g
                ∈
                G
                ∣
                ∃
                m
                ∈
                M
                ,
                (
                g
                R
                m
                ,
                 
                m
                ∈
                Y
                )
                }
                ⊆
                G
              
            
          
        
      
    
    {\textstyle \Diamond \ :\ {\begin{array}{c}X\subseteq G\mapsto \ X^{\Diamond }=\lbrace m\in M\mid \exists g\in G,(gRm,\ g\in X)\rbrace \subseteq M\\Y\subseteq M\mapsto \ Y^{\Diamond }=\lbrace g\in G\mid \exists m\in M,(gRm,\ m\in Y)\rbrace \subseteq G\end{array}}}
  

are considered as different modal operators (Sufficiency, Necessity and Possibility, respectively) that generalise the FCA. For notations, $I$, the operator adopted in the standard FCA, follows Bernhard Ganter and R. Wille; $\Box\mbox{ and }\Diamond$ as well as $R$ follows Y. Y. Yao. By $gRm$, i.e., $(g,m)\in R$ the object $g$ carries the attribute $m$ as its property, which is also referred to as $g\in m^R$ where $m^R$ is the set of all objects carrying the attribute $m$.

With $X,X_1,X_2 \subseteq G \mbox{ and } X^c:=G\backslash X$ it is straightforward to check that

  
    
      
        
          X
          
            I
            I
            I
          
        
        =
        
          X
          
            I
          
        
        ,
        
        
          
            
              
                
                  X
                  
                    ◻
                    ◊
                    ◻
                  
                
                =
                
                  X
                  
                    ◻
                  
                
              
            
            
              
                
                  X
                  
                    ◊
                    ◻
                    ◊
                  
                
                =
                
                  X
                  
                    ◊
                  
                
              
            
          
        
        ,
        
        
          
            
              
                
                  X
                  
                    c
                    ◻
                    c
                  
                
                =
                
                  X
                  
                    ◊
                  
                
              
            
            
              
                
                  X
                  
                    c
                    ◊
                    c
                  
                
                =
                
                  X
                  
                    ◻
                  
                
              
            
          
        
        ,
      
    
    {\displaystyle X^{III}=X^{I},\quad {\begin{array}{c}X^{\Box \Diamond \Box }=X^{\Box }\\X^{\Diamond \Box \Diamond }=X^{\Diamond }\end{array}},\quad {\begin{array}{c}X^{c\Box c}=X^{\Diamond }\\X^{c\Diamond c}=X^{\Box }\end{array}},}
  
 
  
    
      
        
          X
          
            1
          
        
        ⊆
        
          X
          
            2
          
        
        
        ⟺
        
        (
        
          X
          
            2
          
        
        
          )
          
            I
          
        
        ⊆
        (
        
          X
          
            1
          
        
        
          )
          
            I
          
        
        ,
        
        
          
            
              
                
                  X
                  
                    1
                  
                
                ⊆
                
                  X
                  
                    2
                  
                
                
                ⟺
                
                (
                
                  X
                  
                    1
                  
                
                
                  )
                  
                    ◻
                  
                
                ⊆
                (
                
                  X
                  
                    2
                  
                
                
                  )
                  
                    ◻
                  
                
              
            
            
              
                
                  X
                  
                    1
                  
                
                ⊆
                
                  X
                  
                    2
                  
                
                
                ⟺
                
                (
                
                  X
                  
                    1
                  
                
                
                  )
                  
                    ◊
                  
                
                ⊆
                (
                
                  X
                  
                    2
                  
                
                
                  )
                  
                    ◊
                  
                
              
            
          
        
        ,
      
    
    {\displaystyle X_{1}\subseteq X_{2}\iff (X_{2})^{I}\subseteq (X_{1})^{I},\quad {\begin{array}{c}X_{1}\subseteq X_{2}\iff (X_{1})^{\Box }\subseteq (X_{2})^{\Box }\\X_{1}\subseteq X_{2}\iff (X_{1})^{\Diamond }\subseteq (X_{2})^{\Diamond }\end{array}},}
  

where the same relations hold if given in terms of $Y,Y_1,Y_2 \subseteq M \mbox{ and } Y^c:=M\backslash Y$.

=== Two Galois lattices ===
==== Galois connections ====
From the above algebras, there exist different types of Galois connections, e.g.,

(1) 
  
    
      
        X
        ⊆
        
          Y
          
            I
          
        
      
    
    {\displaystyle X\subseteq Y^{I}}
  
 
  
    
      
        
        ⟺
        
        Y
        ⊆
        
          X
          
            I
          
        
      
    
    {\displaystyle \iff Y\subseteq X^{I}}
  
, (2) 
  
    
      
        
          Y
          
            ◊
          
        
        ⊆
        X
      
    
    {\displaystyle Y^{\Diamond }\subseteq X}
  
 
  
    
      
        
        ⟺
        
        Y
        ⊆
        
          X
          
            ◻
          
        
      
    
    {\displaystyle \iff Y\subseteq X^{\Box }}
  

and (3) $X\subseteq Y^{\Box}$ $\iff X^{\Diamond}\subseteq Y$ that corresponds to (2) when one replaces $X \mbox{ for } X^c$and $Y \mbox{ for } Y^c$. Note that (1) and (2) enable different object-oriented constructions for the concept hierarchies FCL and RSL, respectively. Note that (3) corresponds to the attribute-oriented construction where the roles of object and attribute in the RSL are exchanged. The FCL and RSL apply to different 2-tuple $(X,Y)$ concept collections that manifest different well-defined partial orderings.

==== Two concept hierarchies ====
Given as a concept, the 2-tuple $(X,Y)$ is in general constituted by an extent $X\subseteq G$ and an intent $Y\subseteq M$, which should be distinguished when applied to FCL and RSL. The concept $(X,Y)_{fcl}$ is furnished by $X^I=Y\mbox{ and }Y^I=X$ based on (1) while $(X,Y)_{rsl}$ is furnished by $X^{\Box}=Y\mbox{ and }Y^{\Diamond}=X$ based on (2). In essence, there are two Galois lattices based on different orderings of the two collections of concepts as follows.

  
    
      
        (
        
          X
          
            1
          
        
        ,
        
          Y
          
            1
          
        
        
          )
          
            f
            c
            l
          
        
        ≤
        (
        
          X
          
            2
          
        
        ,
        
          Y
          
            2
          
        
        
          )
          
            f
            c
            l
          
        
      
    
    {\displaystyle (X_{1},Y_{1})_{fcl}\leq (X_{2},Y_{2})_{fcl}}
  
 entails 
  
    
      
        
          X
          
            1
          
        
        ⊆
        
          X
          
            2
          
        
      
    
    {\textstyle X_{1}\subseteq X_{2}}
  
 and 
  
    
      
        
          Y
          
            2
          
        
        ⊆
        
          Y
          
            1
          
        
      
    
    {\textstyle Y_{2}\subseteq Y_{1}}
  

since 
  
    
      
        
          X
          
            1
          
        
        ⊆
        
          X
          
            2
          
        
      
    
    {\displaystyle X_{1}\subseteq X_{2}}
  
 iff 
  
    
      
        
          Y
          
            2
          
        
        =
        
          X
          
            2
          
          
            I
          
        
        ⊆
        
          X
          
            1
          
          
            I
          
        
        =
        
          Y
          
            1
          
        
      
    
    {\displaystyle Y_{2}=X_{2}^{I}\subseteq X_{1}^{I}=Y_{1}}
  
, and 
  
    
      
        
          Y
          
            2
          
        
        ⊆
        
          Y
          
            1
          
        
      
    
    {\displaystyle Y_{2}\subseteq Y_{1}}
  
 iff 
  
    
      
        
          X
          
            1
          
        
        =
        
          Y
          
            1
          
          
            I
          
        
        ⊆
        
          Y
          
            2
          
          
            I
          
        
        =
        
          X
          
            2
          
        
      
    
    {\displaystyle X_{1}=Y_{1}^{I}\subseteq Y_{2}^{I}=X_{2}}
  
.

  
    
      
        (
        
          X
          
            1
          
        
        ,
        
          Y
          
            1
          
        
        
          )
          
            r
            s
            l
          
        
        ≤
        (
        
          X
          
            2
          
        
        ,
        
          Y
          
            2
          
        
        
          )
          
            r
            s
            l
          
        
      
    
    {\displaystyle (X_{1},Y_{1})_{rsl}\leq (X_{2},Y_{2})_{rsl}}
  
 entails 
  
    
      
        
          X
          
            1
          
        
        ⊆
        
          X
          
            2
          
        
      
    
    {\textstyle X_{1}\subseteq X_{2}}
  
 and 
  
    
      
        
          Y
          
            1
          
        
        ⊆
        
          Y
          
            2
          
        
      
    
    {\textstyle Y_{1}\subseteq Y_{2}}
  

since 
  
    
      
        
          X
          
            1
          
        
        ⊆
        
          X
          
            2
          
        
      
    
    {\displaystyle X_{1}\subseteq X_{2}}
  
 iff 
  
    
      
        
          Y
          
            1
          
        
        =
        
          X
          
            1
          
          
            ◻
          
        
        ⊆
        
          X
          
            2
          
          
            ◻
          
        
        =
        
          Y
          
            2
          
        
      
    
    {\displaystyle Y_{1}=X_{1}^{\Box }\subseteq X_{2}^{\Box }=Y_{2}}
  
, and 
  
    
      
        
          Y
          
            1
          
        
        ⊆
        
          Y
          
            2
          
        
      
    
    {\displaystyle Y_{1}\subseteq Y_{2}}
  
 iff 
  
    
      
        
          X
          
            1
          
        
        =
        
          Y
          
            1
          
          
            ◊
          
        
        ⊆
        
          Y
          
            2
          
          
            ◊
          
        
        =
        
          X
          
            2
          
        
      
    
    {\displaystyle X_{1}=Y_{1}^{\Diamond }\subseteq Y_{2}^{\Diamond }=X_{2}}
  
.

==== Common extents of FCL and RSL ====
Every attribute listed in the formal context provides an extent for FCL and RSL simultaneously via the object set carrying the attribute. Though the extents for FCL and for RSL do not coincide totally, every $m^R$ for $m\in M$ is known to be a common extent of FCL and RSL. This turns up from the main results in FCL (Formale Begriffsanalyse#Hauptsatz der Formalen Begriffsanalyse) and RSL: every $Y^I$ ($Y\subseteq M$) is an extent for FCL and $Y^\Diamond$is an extent for RSL. Note that choosing $Y=\{m\}$ gives rise to $Y^I=Y^\Diamond=m^R$.

=== Two types of informative implications ===
The consideration of the attribute set-to-set implication $A\stackrel{\scriptscriptstyle fcl}{\rightarrow} B$ ($A, B\subseteq M$) via FCL has an intuitive interpretation: every object possessing all the attributes in $A$ possesses all the attributes in $B$, in other words $A^I\subseteq B^I$. Alternatively, one may consider $A\stackrel{\scriptscriptstyle rsl}{\rightarrow} B$ based on the RSL in a similar manner: the set of all objects carrying any of the attributes in $A$ is contained in the set of all objects carrying any of the attributes in $B$, in other words $A^\Diamond\subseteq B^\Diamond$. It is apparent that $A\stackrel{\scriptscriptstyle fcl}{\rightarrow} B$ and $A\stackrel{\scriptscriptstyle rsl}{\rightarrow} B$ relate different pairs of attribute sets and are incapable of expressing each other.

=== Extension of formal context ===
For every formal context one may acquire its extended version deduced in the sense of completing a truth-value table. It is instructive to explicitly label the object/attribute dependence for the formal context, say, $F(G,M):=(G, M, I)$ rather than $\mathbb{K}:= (G, M, I)$ since one may have to investigate more than one formal contexts. As is illustrated in Table 1, $F_{\scriptscriptstyle 3BS} (G,M)$ can be employed to deduce the extended version $F_{\scriptscriptstyle 3BS}^\ast (G,M^\ast)$, where $M^\ast$ is the set of all attributes constructed out of elements in $M$ by means of Boolean operations. Note that $F_{\scriptscriptstyle 3BS} (G,M)$ includes three columns reflecting the use of $M=\{a,b,c \}$ and $F_1(G,M_1)$ the attribute set $M_1=\{a\ {\bf or}\ b, b\ {\bf or}\ c,c \ {\bf or}\ a \}$.

== Obtaining the general concept lattice ==
=== Observations based on mathematical facts ===
==== Intents in terms of single attributes ====
The FCL and RSL will not be altered if their intents are interpreted as single attributes.

  
    
      
        (
        X
        ,
        Y
        
          )
          
            f
            c
            l
          
        
      
    
    {\displaystyle (X,Y)_{fcl}}
  
 can be understood as 
  
    
      
        (
        X
        ,
        μ
        
          )
          
            f
            c
            l
          
        
      
    
    {\displaystyle (X,\mu )_{fcl}}
  
 with 
  
    
      
        μ
        =
        ∏
        Y
      
    
    {\textstyle \mu =\prod Y}
  
 (the conjunction of all elements in 
  
    
      
        Y
      
    
    {\displaystyle Y}
  
),
  
    
      
         
        
          
            
              
                
                  ∏
                  
                    X
                    
                      I
                    
                  
                  =
                  μ
                
              
              
                
                  
                    μ
                    
                      R
                    
                  
                  =
                  X
                
              
            
          
        
      
    
    {\displaystyle \ {\begin{smallmatrix}\prod X^{I}=\mu \\\mu ^{R}=X\end{smallmatrix}}}
  
 plays the role of 
  
    
      
        
          
            
              
                
                  
                    X
                    
                      I
                    
                  
                  =
                  Y
                
              
              
                
                  
                    Y
                    
                      I
                    
                  
                  =
                  X
                
              
            
          
        
      
    
    {\displaystyle {\begin{smallmatrix}X^{I}=Y\\Y^{I}=X\end{smallmatrix}}}
  
 since 
  
    
      
        
          Y
          
            I
          
        
        =
        (
        ∏
        Y
        
          )
          
            R
          
        
        =
        
          μ
          
            R
          
        
        ⊆
        G
      
    
    {\textstyle Y^{I}=(\prod Y)^{R}=\mu ^{R}\subseteq G}
  
.

  
    
      
        (
        X
        ,
        Y
        
          )
          
            r
            s
            l
          
        
      
    
    {\displaystyle (X,Y)_{rsl}}
  
 can be understood as 
  
    
      
        (
        X
        ,
        μ
        
          )
          
            r
            s
            l
          
        
      
    
    {\displaystyle (X,\mu )_{rsl}}
  
 with 
  
    
      
        μ
        =
        ∑
        Y
      
    
    {\textstyle \mu =\sum Y}
  
 (the disjunction of all elements in 
  
    
      
        Y
      
    
    {\displaystyle Y}
  
),
  
    
      
         
        
          
            
              
                
                  ∑
                  
                    X
                    
                      ◻
                    
                  
                  =
                  μ
                
              
              
                
                  
                    μ
                    
                      R
                    
                  
                  =
                  X
                
              
            
          
        
      
    
    {\displaystyle \ {\begin{smallmatrix}\sum X^{\Box }=\mu \\\mu ^{R}=X\end{smallmatrix}}}
  
 plays the role of 
  
    
      
        
          
            
              
                
                  
                    X
                    
                      ◻
                    
                  
                  =
                  Y
                
              
              
                
                  
                    Y
                    
                      ◊
                    
                  
                  =
                  X
                
              
            
          
        
      
    
    {\displaystyle {\begin{smallmatrix}X^{\Box }=Y\\Y^{\Diamond }=X\end{smallmatrix}}}
  
 since 
  
    
      
        
          Y
          
            ◊
          
        
        =
        (
        ∑
        Y
        
          )
          
            R
          
        
        =
        
          μ
          
            R
          
        
        ⊆
        G
      
    
    {\textstyle Y^{\Diamond }=(\sum Y)^{R}=\mu ^{R}\subseteq G}
  
.

Here, the dot product $\cdot\ (\prod)$ stands for the conjunction (the dots is often omitted for compactness) and the summation $+\ (\sum)$ the disjunction, which are notations in the Curry-Howard style. Note that the orderings become

  
    
      
        (
        
          X
          
            1
          
        
        ,
        
          μ
          
            1
          
        
        
          )
          
            f
            c
            l
          
        
        ≤
        (
        
          X
          
            2
          
        
        ,
        
          μ
          
            2
          
        
        
          )
          
            f
            c
            l
          
        
      
    
    {\displaystyle (X_{1},\mu _{1})_{fcl}\leq (X_{2},\mu _{2})_{fcl}}
  
 and 
  
    
      
        (
        
          X
          
            1
          
        
        ,
        
          μ
          
            1
          
        
        
          )
          
            r
            s
            l
          
        
        ≤
        (
        
          X
          
            2
          
        
        ,
        
          μ
          
            2
          
        
        
          )
          
            r
            s
            l
          
        
      
    
    {\displaystyle (X_{1},\mu _{1})_{rsl}\leq (X_{2},\mu _{2})_{rsl}}
  
, both are implemented by 
  
    
      
        
          X
          
            1
          
        
        ⊆
        
          X
          
            2
          
        
      
    
    {\textstyle X_{1}\subseteq X_{2}}
  

  
    
      
        
        ⟺
        
      
    
    {\textstyle \iff }
  

  
    
      
        
          μ
          
            1
          
        
        ≤
        
          μ
          
            2
          
        
      
    
    {\textstyle \mu _{1}\leq \mu _{2}}
  
.

==== Implications from single attribute to single attribute ====
Concerning the implications extracted from formal context,

 
  
    
      
        
          μ
          
            1
          
        
        →
        
          μ
          
            2
          
        
      
    
    {\displaystyle \mu _{1}\rightarrow \mu _{2}}
  
 serves as the general form of implication relations available from the formal context, which holds for any pair of 
  
    
      
        
          μ
          
            1
          
        
        ,
        
          μ
          
            2
          
        
        ∈
        
          M
          
            ∗
          
        
      
    
    {\textstyle \mu _{1},\mu _{2}\in M^{\ast }}
  
 fulfilling 
  
    
      
        
          μ
          
            1
          
          
            R
          
        
        ⊆
        
          μ
          
            2
          
          
            R
          
        
      
    
    {\displaystyle \mu _{1}^{R}\subseteq \mu _{2}^{R}}
  
.

Note that $\mu_1^R\subseteq \mu_2^R$ turns out to be trivial if $\mu_1\leq \mu_2$, which entails $\mu_1=\mu_1\cdot \mu_2$. Intuitively, every object carrying $\mu_1$ is an object carrying $\mu_2$, which means the implication any object having the property $\mu_1$ must also have the property $\mu_2$. In particular,

  
    
      
        A
        
          
            
              
                →
              
              
                
                  f
                  c
                  l
                
              
            
          
        
        B
      
    
    {\textstyle A{\stackrel {\scriptscriptstyle fcl}{\rightarrow }}B}
  
 can be interpreted as 
  
    
      
        
          μ
          
            1
          
        
        →
        
          μ
          
            2
          
        
      
    
    {\displaystyle \mu _{1}\rightarrow \mu _{2}}
  
 with 
  
    
      
        
          μ
          
            1
          
        
        =
        ∏
        A
      
    
    {\textstyle \mu _{1}=\prod A}
  
 and 
  
    
      
        
          μ
          
            2
          
        
        =
        ∏
        B
      
    
    {\textstyle \mu _{2}=\prod B}
  
,

  
    
      
        A
        
          
            
              
                →
              
              
                
                  r
                  s
                  l
                
              
            
          
        
        B
      
    
    {\textstyle A{\stackrel {\scriptscriptstyle rsl}{\rightarrow }}B}
  
 can be interpreted as 
  
    
      
        
          μ
          
            1
          
        
        →
        
          μ
          
            2
          
        
      
    
    {\displaystyle \mu _{1}\rightarrow \mu _{2}}
  
 with 
  
    
      
        
          μ
          
            1
          
        
        =
        ∑
        A
      
    
    {\textstyle \mu _{1}=\sum A}
  
 and 
  
    
      
        
          μ
          
            2
          
        
        =
        ∑
        B
      
    
    {\textstyle \mu _{2}=\sum B}
  
,

where $A^I\subseteq B^I$ and $A^\Diamond\subseteq B^\Diamond$ collapse into $\mu_1^R\subseteq \mu_2^R$.

=== Lattice of 3-tuple concepts with double Galois connection ===
When extended to $F^\ast(G,M^\ast)$, the algebras of derivation operators remain formally unchanged, apart from the generalisation from $m\in M$ to $\mu \in M^\ast$ which is signified in terms of the replacements $I\mbox{ by }I^\ast$, $\Box\mbox{ by }\Box^\ast$ and $\Diamond\mbox{ by }\Diamond^\ast$. The concepts under consideration become then $(X, Y)^\ast_{fcl}$ and $(X, Y)^\ast_{rsl}$, where $X\subseteq G$ and $Y\subseteq M^\ast$, which are constructions allowable by the two Galois connections i.e. $X\subseteq Y^{I^\ast}\iff Y \subseteq X^{I^\ast}$ and $Y^{\Diamond^\ast}\subseteq X \iff Y\subseteq X^{\Box^\ast}$, respectively. Henceforth,

  
    
      
        
          X
          
            
              I
              
                ∗
              
            
          
        
        =
        Y
      
    
    {\textstyle X^{I^{\ast }}=Y}
  
 and 
  
    
      
        
          Y
          
            
              I
              
                ∗
              
            
          
        
        =
        X
      
    
    {\textstyle Y^{I^{\ast }}=X}
  
 for 
  
    
      
        (
        X
        ,
        Y
        
          )
          
            f
            c
            l
          
          
            ∗
          
        
      
    
    {\textstyle (X,Y)_{fcl}^{\ast }}
  
, 
  
    
      
        
          X
          
            
              ◻
              
                ∗
              
            
          
        
        =
        Y
      
    
    {\textstyle X^{\Box ^{\ast }}=Y}
  
 and 
  
    
      
        
          Y
          
            
              ◊
              
                ∗
              
            
          
        
        =
        X
      
    
    {\textstyle Y^{\Diamond ^{\ast }}=X}
  
 for 
  
    
      
        (
        X
        ,
        Y
        
          )
          
            r
            s
            l
          
          
            ∗
          
        
      
    
    {\textstyle (X,Y)_{rsl}^{\ast }}
  
.

The extents for the two concepts now coincide exactly. All the attributes in $M^\ast$ are listed in the formal context $F^\ast(G,M^\ast)$, each contributes a common extent for FCL and RSL. Furthermore, the collection of these common extents $E_F:=\{\mu^R\mid\mu\in M^\ast\}$ amounts to $\{\bigcup_{k\in J} D_k\mid J\subseteq \{1\ldots n_F\}\}$ which exhausts all the possible unions of the minimal object sets discernible by the formal context. Note that each $D_k$ collects objects of the same property, see Table 2. One may then join $(X, Y)^\ast_{fcl}$ and $(X, Y)^\ast_{rsl}$ into a 3-tuple with common extent:

 
  
    
      
        (
        X
        ,
        
          Y
          
            f
            c
            l
            ∗
          
        
        ,
        
          Y
          
            r
            s
            l
            ∗
          
        
        )
      
    
    {\textstyle (X,Y^{fcl\ast },Y^{rsl\ast })}
  
 where 
  
    
      
        
          X
          
            
              I
              
                ∗
              
            
          
        
        =
        
          Y
          
            f
            c
            l
            ∗
          
        
      
    
    {\textstyle X^{I^{\ast }}=Y^{fcl\ast }}
  
, 
  
    
      
        
          X
          
            
              ◻
              
                ∗
              
            
          
        
        =
        
          
            Y
            
              r
              s
              l
              ∗
            
          
        
      
    
    {\textstyle X^{\Box ^{\ast }}={Y^{rsl\ast }}}
  
 and 
  
    
      
        
          
            
              Y
              
                f
                c
                l
                ∗
              
            
          
          
            
              I
              
                ∗
              
            
          
        
        =
        
          
            
              Y
              
                r
                s
                l
                ∗
              
            
          
          
            
              ◊
              
                ∗
              
            
          
        
        =
        X
      
    
    {\textstyle {Y^{fcl\ast }}^{I^{\ast }}={Y^{rsl\ast }}^{\Diamond ^{\ast }}=X}
  
.

Note that $Y^{fcl\ast}\mbox{ and }Y^{rsl\ast}$are introduced in order to differentiate the two intents. Clearly, the number of these 3-tuples equals the cardinality of set of common extent which counts $|E_F|=2^{n_F}$. Moreover, $(X,Y^{fcl\ast},Y^{rsl\ast})$ manifests well-defined ordering. For $X_1, X_2\in E_F\subseteq G\$, where ${Y_1^{fcl\ast}},{Y_2^{fcl\ast}}\subset M^\ast$and ${Y_1^{rsl\ast}},{Y_2^{rsl\ast}}\subset M^\ast$,

  
    
      
        (
        
          X
          
            1
          
        
        ,
        
          
            Y
            
              1
            
            
              f
              c
              l
              ∗
            
          
        
        ,
        
          
            Y
            
              1
            
            
              r
              s
              l
              ∗
            
          
        
        )
        ≤
        (
        
          X
          
            2
          
        
        ,
        
          
            Y
            
              2
            
            
              f
              c
              l
              ∗
            
          
        
        ,
        
          
            Y
            
              2
            
            
              r
              s
              l
              ∗
            
          
        
        )
      
    
    {\textstyle (X_{1},{Y_{1}^{fcl\ast }},{Y_{1}^{rsl\ast }})\leq (X_{2},{Y_{2}^{fcl\ast }},{Y_{2}^{rsl\ast }})}
  
 iff 
  
    
      
        
          X
          
            1
          
        
        ⊆
        
          X
          
            2
          
        
      
    
    {\textstyle X_{1}\subseteq X_{2}}
  
 and 
  
    
      
        
          
            Y
            
              2
            
            
              f
              c
              l
              ∗
            
          
        
        ⊆
        
          
            Y
            
              1
            
            
              f
              c
              l
              ∗
            
          
        
      
    
    {\textstyle {Y_{2}^{fcl\ast }}\subseteq {Y_{1}^{fcl\ast }}}
  
 and 
  
    
      
        
          
            Y
            
              1
            
            
              r
              s
              l
              ∗
            
          
        
        ⊆
        
          
            Y
            
              2
            
            
              r
              s
              l
              ∗
            
          
        
      
    
    {\textstyle {Y_{1}^{rsl\ast }}\subseteq {Y_{2}^{rsl\ast }}}
  
.

=== Emergence of the GCL ===
While it is generically impossible to determine $Y^{fcl\ast}\mbox{ and }Y^{rsl\ast}$ subject to $X\in E_F\subseteq G$, the structure of concept hierarchy need not rely on these intents directly. An efficient way to implement the concept hierarchy for $(X,Y^{fcl\ast},Y^{rsl\ast})$ is to consider intents in terms of single attributes.

Let henceforth $\eta(X):=\prod Y^{fcl\ast}$ and $\rho(X):=\sum Y^{rsl\ast}$. Upon introducing $[X]_F:=\{\mu\in M^\ast\mid \mu^R=X\}$, one may check that $\prod [X]_F=\prod Y^{fcl\ast}$ and $\sum [X]_F=\sum Y^{rsl\ast}$, $\forall X\in E_F$. Therefore,

  
    
      
        [
        X
        
          ]
          
            F
          
        
        ≡
        [
        η
        (
        X
        )
        ,
        ρ
        (
        X
        )
        ]
        =
        {
        μ
        ∈
        
          M
          
            ∗
          
        
        ∣
        η
        (
        X
        )
        ≤
        μ
        ≤
        ρ
        (
        X
        )
        }
      
    
    {\textstyle [X]_{F}\equiv [\eta (X),\rho (X)]=\{\mu \in M^{\ast }\mid \eta (X)\leq \mu \leq \rho (X)\}}
  
, 

which is a closed interval bounded from below by $\eta(X)$ and from above by $\rho(X)$ since $\forall\mu\ \mu^R=X\implies \eta(X)\leq\mu\leq \rho(X)$. Moreover,

  
    
      
        ∀
        
          X
          
            1
          
        
        ∀
        
          X
          
            2
          
        
        ∈
        
          E
          
            F
          
        
         
        
          X
          
            1
          
        
        ≠
        
          X
          
            2
          
        
      
    
    {\textstyle \forall X_{1}\forall X_{2}\in E_{F}\ X_{1}\neq X_{2}}
  
 iff 
  
    
      
        [
        
          X
          
            1
          
        
        
          ]
          
            F
          
        
        ∩
        [
        
          X
          
            2
          
        
        
          ]
          
            F
          
        
        =
        ∅
      
    
    {\textstyle [X_{1}]_{F}\cap [X_{2}]_{F}=\emptyset }
  
, 
  
    
      
        
          X
          
            1
          
        
        ⊂
        
          X
          
            2
          
        
      
    
    {\textstyle X_{1}\subset X_{2}}
  
 iff 
  
    
      
        η
        (
        
          X
          
            1
          
        
        )
        <
        η
        (
        
          X
          
            2
          
        
        )
      
    
    {\textstyle \eta (X_{1})<\eta (X_{2})}
  
 iff 
  
    
      
        ρ
        (
        
          X
          
            1
          
        
        )
        <
        ρ
        (
        
          X
          
            2
          
        
        )
      
    
    {\textstyle \rho (X_{1})<\rho (X_{2})}
  
.

In addition, $\bigcup_{X\in E_F}[X]_F=M^\ast$, namely, the collection of intents $[X]_F$ exhausts all the generalised attributes $M^\ast$, in comparison to $\bigcup_{X\in E_F} X=G$. Then, the GCL enters as the lattice structure $\Gamma_F:=(L_F,\wedge,\vee)$ based on the formal context via $F^\ast(G,M^\ast)$:

- The collection of all the general concepts $L_F=\{(X,[X]_F)\mid\ X\in E_F\}$ constitutes the poset $(L_F,\leq)$ ordered as

  
    
      
        
          l
          
            1
          
        
        :=
        (
        
          X
          
            1
          
        
        ,
        [
        
          X
          
            1
          
        
        
          ]
          
            F
          
        
        )
        ≤
        
          l
          
            2
          
        
        :=
        (
        
          X
          
            2
          
        
        ,
        [
        
          X
          
            2
          
        
        
          ]
          
            F
          
        
        )
      
    
    {\textstyle l_{1}:=(X_{1},[X_{1}]_{F})\leq l_{2}:=(X_{2},[X_{2}]_{F})}
  
 iff 
  
    
      
        
          X
          
            1
          
        
        ⊆
        
          X
          
            2
          
        
      
    
    {\textstyle X_{1}\subseteq X_{2}}
  
 and 
  
    
      
        η
        (
        
          X
          
            1
          
        
        )
        ≤
        η
        (
        
          X
          
            2
          
        
        )
      
    
    {\textstyle \eta (X_{1})\leq \eta (X_{2})}
  
 and 
  
    
      
        ρ
        (
        
          X
          
            2
          
        
        )
        ≤
        ρ
        (
        
          X
          
            2
          
        
        )
      
    
    {\textstyle \rho (X_{2})\leq \rho (X_{2})}
  
.

- Both $\wedge$ (meet) and $\vee$ (join) operations are applicable for finding further lattice points:

  
    
      
        
          l
          
            1
          
        
        ∧
        
          l
          
            2
          
        
        =
        
          (
          
            
              X
              
                1
              
            
            ∩
            
              X
              
                2
              
            
            ,
            [
            
              X
              
                1
              
            
            ∩
            
              X
              
                2
              
            
            
              ]
              
                F
              
            
          
          )
        
        ∈
        
          L
          
            F
          
        
      
    
    {\displaystyle l_{1}\wedge l_{2}=\left(X_{1}\cap X_{2},[X_{1}\cap X_{2}]_{F}\right)\in L_{F}}
  
, where 
  
    
      
        [
        
          X
          
            1
          
        
        ∩
        
          X
          
            2
          
        
        
          ]
          
            F
          
        
        =
        [
        η
        (
        
          X
          
            1
          
        
        ∩
        
          X
          
            2
          
        
        )
        ,
        ρ
        (
        
          X
          
            1
          
        
        ∩
        
          X
          
            2
          
        
        )
        ]
        =
        [
        η
        (
        
          X
          
            1
          
        
        )
        ⋅
        η
        (
        
          X
          
            2
          
        
        )
        ,
        ρ
        (
        
          X
          
            1
          
        
        )
        ⋅
        ρ
        (
        
          X
          
            2
          
        
        )
        ]
        ,
      
    
    {\textstyle [X_{1}\cap X_{2}]_{F}=[\eta (X_{1}\cap X_{2}),\rho (X_{1}\cap X_{2})]=[\eta (X_{1})\cdot \eta (X_{2}),\rho (X_{1})\cdot \rho (X_{2})],}
  

  
    
      
        
          l
          
            1
          
        
        ∨
        
          l
          
            2
          
        
        =
        
          (
          
            
              X
              
                1
              
            
            ∪
            
              X
              
                2
              
            
            ,
            [
            
              X
              
                1
              
            
            ∪
            
              X
              
                2
              
            
            
              ]
              
                F
              
            
          
          )
        
        ∈
        
          L
          
            F
          
        
      
    
    {\textstyle l_{1}\vee l_{2}=\left(X_{1}\cup X_{2},[X_{1}\cup X_{2}]_{F}\right)\in L_{F}}
  
, where
  
    
      
        [
        
          X
          
            1
          
        
        ∪
        
          X
          
            2
          
        
        
          ]
          
            F
          
        
        =
        [
        η
        (
        
          X
          
            1
          
        
        ∪
        
          X
          
            2
          
        
        )
        ,
        ρ
        (
        
          X
          
            1
          
        
        ∪
        
          X
          
            2
          
        
        )
        ]
        =
        [
        η
        (
        
          X
          
            1
          
        
        )
        +
        η
        (
        
          X
          
            2
          
        
        )
        ,
        ρ
        (
        
          X
          
            1
          
        
        )
        +
        ρ
        (
        
          X
          
            2
          
        
        )
        ]
        .
      
    
    {\textstyle [X_{1}\cup X_{2}]_{F}=[\eta (X_{1}\cup X_{2}),\rho (X_{1}\cup X_{2})]=[\eta (X_{1})+\eta (X_{2}),\rho (X_{1})+\rho (X_{2})].}
  

- The GCL appears to be a complete lattice since both $l_{sup}$ and $l_{inf}$ can be found in $L_F$:

  
    
      
        
          l
          
            s
            u
            p
          
        
        =
        
          ⋁
          
            l
            ∈
            
              L
              
                F
              
            
          
        
        l
        =
        (
        G
        ,
        [
        G
        
          ]
          
            F
          
        
        )
        =
        (
        G
        ,
        [
        η
        (
        G
        )
        ,
        
          
            1
          
        
        ]
        )
      
    
    {\textstyle l_{sup}=\bigvee _{l\in L_{F}}l=(G,[G]_{F})=(G,[\eta (G),{\bf {1}}])}
  
, 
  
    
      
        
          l
          
            i
            n
            f
          
        
        =
        
          ⋀
          
            l
            ∈
            
              L
              
                F
              
            
          
        
        l
        =
        (
        ∅
        ,
        [
        ∅
        
          ]
          
            F
          
        
        )
        =
        (
        ∅
        ,
        [
        
          
            0
          
        
        ,
        ρ
        (
        ∅
        )
        ]
        )
      
    
    {\textstyle l_{inf}=\bigwedge _{l\in L_{F}}l=(\emptyset ,[\emptyset ]_{F})=(\emptyset ,[{\bf {0}},\rho (\emptyset )])}
  
.

== Consequence of the general concept lattice ==
=== Manageable general lattice ===
The construction for FCL was known to count on efficient algorithms, not to mention the construction for RSL which did not receive much attention yet. Intriguingly, though the GCL furnishes the general structure on which both the FCL and RSL can be rediscovered, the GCL can be acquired via simple readout.

==== Reading out the lattice ====
The completion of GCL is equivalent to the completion of the intents of GCL in terms of the lower and bounds.

- The lower bounds $(\eta(X)\mbox{ for } X\in E_F)$ can be employed to determine the upper bounds $(\rho(X)\mbox{ for } X\in E_F)$, and vice versa. For concreteness, both $X$ and $X^c$ are extents of the GCL, $(X,[X]_F)=(X,[\eta(X),\rho(X)])$ coexists with $(X^c,[X^c]_F)$$=(X^c,[\eta(X^c),\rho(X^c)])$. Subsequently, $\eta(X^c)=\neg \rho(X)$ and $\neg \eta(X)= \rho(X^c)$, where $\eta(X^c)=\neg \rho(X)\iff\neg \eta(X)= \rho(X^c)$.
- The lower bounds of intents corresponding to minimal discernible object sets ($D_k$s for $1\leq k\leq n_F$) can be employed to determine all the intents. Note that $D_k\in E_F$ and $\eta(D_k)=\prod \Psi^k$ appears to be a direct readout by means of $\Psi^k=\lbrace m\in M \mid m\in D_k^I\rbrace\cup\lbrace \neg m \mid m\not\in D_k^I, m\in M\rbrace$.

Fig. 3: Identifying FCL and RSL on the GCL for the 3BS according to the formal context $F(G,M)$ in Table 1. Every general intent $[X]_F$ comprises all the attributes uniquely possessed by the object set $X$ in common. Elements on $[X]_F$ can be ordered as a Hasse diagram identifiable with the closed interval $[\eta(X),\rho(X)]$ where $\rho(X)=\eta(X)+0_\rho$.

The above enables the determinations of the intents depicted as in Fig. 3 for the 3BS given by Table 1, where one can read out that $\eta(\{1\})=a\neg b\neg c$, $\eta(\{2\})=\neg a b\neg c$ and $\eta(\{3\})=\neg a b\neg c$. Hence, e.g., $\rho(\{1,2\})=\neg \eta(\{ 3 \})= a+ b+\neg c$, $\eta(\{1,2\})=a\neg b\neg c+ \neg a b\neg c=\neg \rho(\{ 3 \})$. Note that the GCL also appears to be a Hasse diagram due to the resemblance of its extents to a power set. Moreover, each intent $[X]_F=[\eta(X), \rho(X)]$ at $X$ also exhibits another Hasse diagram isomorphic to the ordering of attributes in the closed interval $[{\bf 0}, 0_\rho]$. It can be shown that $\forall X\in E_F\ \rho(X)=\eta(X)+0_\rho$ where $0_\rho:=\neg 1_\eta\equiv \rho(\emptyset)$ with $1_\eta:=\sum_{k=1}^{n_F} \eta(D_k)\equiv \eta(G)$. Hence, $[X]_F=\{ \eta(X)+\tau\mid {\bf 0}\leq\tau\leq 0_\rho\}$ making the cardinality $|[X]_F|$ a constant given as $2^{2^{|M|}-n_F}$. Clearly, one may check that $\rho(\{1,2\})=\neg \eta(\{ 3 \})= \eta(\{1,2\})+ 0_\rho$

==== Rediscovering FCL and RSL on the GCL ====
The GCL underlies the original FCL and RSL subject to $F(G,M)$, as one can tell from $\eta(X)=\prod Y^{fcl\ast}$ and $\rho(X)=\sum Y^{rsl\ast}$. To rediscover a node for FCL, one looks for a conjunction of attributes in $M$ contained in $[X]_F$, which can be identified within the conjunctive normal form of $\eta(X)$ if exists. Likewise, for the RSL one looks for a disjunction of attributes in $M$ contained in $[X]_F$, which can be found within the disjunctive normal form of $\rho(X)$, see Fig 3.

For instance, from the node $(\{3\},[\{3 \}]_F)$ on the GCL, one finds that $\eta(\{3\})=\neg a\neg bc\leq c$ $\leq (a+\neg b+c)(\neg a+ b+c)$$= \rho(\{ 3\})$. Note that $c$ appears to be the only attribute belonging to $[\{3\}]_F$, which is simultaneously a conjunction and a disjunction. Therefore, both the FCL and RSL have the concept $(\{3\},\{c\})$ in common. To illustrate a different situation, $\rho(\{1,3\})=(a+\neg b+c)\geq a+c$$\geq a\neg b\neg c+\neg a\neg bc$$= \eta(\{ 1,3 \})$. Apparently, $a+c$ is the attribute emerging as disjunction of elements in $M$ which belongs to $[\{1,3\}]_F$, in which no attribute composed by conjunction of elements in $M$ is found. Hence, $\{1,3\}$ could not be an extent of FCL, it only constitutes the concept $(\{1, 3\},\{a,c\})$ for the RSL.

=== Information content of a formal context ===
==== Informative implications as equivalence due to categorisation ====
Non-tautological implication relations signify the information contained in the formal context and are referred to as informative implications. In general, $\mu_1^R\subseteq \mu_2^R$ entails the implication $\mu_1\rightarrow \mu_2$. The implication is informative if it is $not\ \mu_1 \leq \mu_2$ (i.e. $\mu_1\neq \mu_1\cdot\mu_2$).

In case it is strictly $\mu_1^R\subset \mu_2^R$, one has $\mu_1^R=\mu_1^R\cap\mu_2^R=(\mu_1\cdot \mu_2)^R$ where $\mu_1^R\cap\mu_2^R\subset \mu_2^R$. Then, $\mu_1\rightarrow \mu_2$ can be replaced by means of $\mu_1\leftrightarrow \mu_1\cdot\mu_2$ together with the tautology $\mu_1\cdot \mu_2\implies \mu_2$. Therefore, what remains to be taken into account is the equivalence $\mu^R= \nu^R=X$ for some $X\in E_F$. Logically, both attributes are properties carried by the same object class, $\mu\leftrightarrow \nu$ reflects that equivalence relation.

All attributes in $[X]_F$ must be mutually implied, which can be implemented, e.g., by $\forall \mu\in [X]_F\ \mu\rightarrow \eta(X)$ (in fact, $\mu\leftrightarrow \eta(X)$ where $\eta(X)\rightarrow \mu$ is a tautology), i.e., all attributes are equivalent to the lower bound of intent.

==== A formula that implements all the informative implications ====
Extraction of the implications of type $A\stackrel{\scriptscriptstyle fcl}{\rightarrow} B$ from the formal context was known to be complicated, it necessitates efforts for constructing a canonical basis, which does not apply to the implications of type $A\stackrel{\scriptscriptstyle rsl}{\rightarrow} B$. By contrast, the above equivalence only proposes

- the single formula generating all the informative implications:

  
    
      
        ∀
        μ
        ∈
        
          M
          
            ∗
          
        
         
        μ
        →
        μ
        ⋅
        
          1
          
            η
          
        
      
    
    {\textstyle \forall \mu \in M^{\ast }\ \mu \rightarrow \mu \cdot 1_{\eta }}
  
, which can be restated as 
  
    
      
        ∀
        μ
        ∈
        
          M
          
            ∗
          
        
         
        μ
        +
        
          0
          
            ρ
          
        
        →
        μ
      
    
    {\textstyle \forall \mu \in M^{\ast }\ \mu +0_{\rho }\rightarrow \mu }
  
,

- as an auxiliary formula,

  
    
      
        
          μ
          
            1
          
        
        →
        
          μ
          
            2
          
        
      
    
    {\textstyle \mu _{1}\rightarrow \mu _{2}}
  
 is allowed by the formal context iff 
  
    
      
        
          μ
          
            1
          
        
        ⋅
        
          1
          
            η
          
        
        ≤
        
          μ
          
            2
          
        
        ⋅
        
          1
          
            η
          
        
      
    
    {\textstyle \mu _{1}\cdot 1_{\eta }\leq \mu _{2}\cdot 1_{\eta }}
  
 (or 
  
    
      
        
          μ
          
            1
          
        
        +
        
          0
          
            ρ
          
        
        ≤
        
          μ
          
            2
          
        
        +
        
          0
          
            ρ
          
        
      
    
    {\textstyle \mu _{1}+0_{\rho }\leq \mu _{2}+0_{\rho }}
  
).

Hence, purely algebraic formulae can be employed to determine the implication relations, one need not consult the object-attribute dependence in the formal context, which is the typical effort in finding the canonical basis.

Remarkably, $1_\eta$ and $0_\rho$ are referred to as the contextual truth and falsity, respectively. $\forall X \in E_F$ $0_\rho+\rho(X)=\rho(X)$ and $0_\rho\cdot\rho(X)=0_\rho$ as well as $1_\eta\cdot \eta(X)=\eta(X)$ and $1_\eta+ \eta(X)=1_\eta$ similar to the conventional truth 1 and falsity 0 that can be identified with $\rho(G)$ and $\eta(\emptyset)$, respectively.

==== Beyond the set-to-set implications ====
$A\stackrel{\scriptscriptstyle fcl}{\rightarrow} B$ and $A\stackrel{\scriptscriptstyle rsl}{\rightarrow} B$ are found to be particular forms of $\mu_1\rightarrow \mu_2$. Assume $A=\{a_1,a_2,\ldots\}\subseteq M$ and $B=\{b_1,b_2,\ldots\}\subseteq M$ for both cases. By $A\stackrel{\scriptscriptstyle fcl}{\rightarrow} B$, an object set carrying all the attributes in $A$ implies carrying all the attributes in $B$ simultaneously, i.e. $\prod_i a_i\rightarrow \prod_i b_i$. By $A\stackrel{\scriptscriptstyle rsl}{\rightarrow} B$, an object set carrying any of the attributes in $A$ implies carrying some of the attributes in $B$, therefore $\sum_i a_i\rightarrow \sum_i b_i$. Notably, the point of view conjunction-to-conjunction has also been emphasised by Ganter while dealing with the attribute exploration.

One could overlook significant parts of the logic content in formal context were it not for the consideration based on the GCL. Here, the formal context describing 3BS given in Table 1 suggests an extreme case where no implication of the type $A\stackrel{\scriptscriptstyle rsl}{\rightarrow} B$ could be found. Nevertheless, one ends up, e.g., $\{a,b\}\stackrel{\scriptscriptstyle fcl}{\rightarrow} \{a,b,c \}$ (or $\{a,b\}\stackrel{\scriptscriptstyle fcl}{\rightarrow} \{c \}$), whose meaning appears to be ambiguous. Though it is true that $ab \rightarrow abc$, one also notices that $(ab)^R=\{a,b\}^I=\emptyset$ as well as $(abc)^R=\{a,b,c\}^I$ $= \emptyset$. Indeed, by using the above formula with the $1_\eta$ provided in Fig. 2 it can be seen that $ab\cdot 1_\eta\equiv {\bf 0}$ $\equiv abc\cdot 1_\eta$, hence it is $ab \leftrightarrow {\bf 0}$ and $abc \leftrightarrow {\bf 0}$ that underlies $ab \rightarrow abc$.

Remarkably, the same formula will lead to (1) $a\rightarrow a\neg b\neg c$ (or $a \rightarrow \neg b\neg c$) and (2) $\neg b\neg c\rightarrow \neg b\neg ca$ (or $\neg b\neg c\rightarrow a$), where $a$, $b$ and $c$ can be interchanged. Hence, what one has captured from the 3BS are that (1) no two colours could coexist and that (2) there is no colour other than $a$, $b$ and $c$. The two issues are certainly less trivial in the scopes of $A\stackrel{\scriptscriptstyle fcl}{\rightarrow} B$ and $A\stackrel{\scriptscriptstyle rsl}{\rightarrow} B$.

==== Rules to assemble or transform implications ====
The rules to assemble or transform implications of type $\mu\rightarrow \nu$ are of direct consequences of object set inclusion relations. Notably, some of these rules can be reduced to the Armstrong axioms, which pertain to the main considerations of Guigues and Duquenne based on the non-redundant collection of informative implications acquired via FCL. In particular,

(1) 
  
    
      
        
          μ
          
            1
          
        
        →
        
          μ
          
            2
          
        
      
    
    {\textstyle \mu _{1}\rightarrow \mu _{2}}
  
 and 
  
    
      
        
          ν
          
            1
          
        
        →
        
          ν
          
            2
          
        
      
    
    {\textstyle \nu _{1}\rightarrow \nu _{2}}
  
 
  
    
      
        
        ⟹
        
      
    
    {\textstyle \implies }
  
 
  
    
      
        
          μ
          
            1
          
        
        ⋅
        
          ν
          
            1
          
        
        →
        
          μ
          
            2
          
        
        ⋅
        
          ν
          
            2
          
        
      
    
    {\textstyle \mu _{1}\cdot \nu _{1}\rightarrow \mu _{2}\cdot \nu _{2}}
  

since 
  
    
      
        
          μ
          
            1
          
          
            R
          
        
        ⊆
        
          μ
          
            2
          
          
            R
          
        
      
    
    {\textstyle \mu _{1}^{R}\subseteq \mu _{2}^{R}}
  
 and 
  
    
      
        
          ν
          
            1
          
          
            R
          
        
        ⊆
        
          ν
          
            2
          
          
            R
          
        
      
    
    {\textstyle \nu _{1}^{R}\subseteq \nu _{2}^{R}}
  
 leads to 
  
    
      
        
          μ
          
            1
          
          
            R
          
        
        ∩
        
          ν
          
            1
          
          
            R
          
        
        ⊆
        
          μ
          
            2
          
          
            R
          
        
        ∩
        
          ν
          
            2
          
          
            R
          
        
      
    
    {\textstyle \mu _{1}^{R}\cap \nu _{1}^{R}\subseteq \mu _{2}^{R}\cap \nu _{2}^{R}}
  
, i.e., 
  
    
      
        (
        
          μ
          
            1
          
        
        ⋅
        
          ν
          
            1
          
        
        
          )
          
            R
          
        
        ⊆
        (
        
          μ
          
            2
          
        
        ⋅
        
          ν
          
            2
          
        
        
          )
          
            R
          
        
      
    
    {\textstyle (\mu _{1}\cdot \nu _{1})^{R}\subseteq (\mu _{2}\cdot \nu _{2})^{R}}
  
.

In the case of $\mu_1=\prod A_1$, $\nu_1=\prod B_1$, $\mu_2=\prod A_2$ and $\nu_2=\prod B_2$, where $A_1,A_2,B_1,B_2$ are sets of attributes, the rule (1) can be re-expressed as Armstrong's composition:

(1') 
  
    
      
        
          A
          
            1
          
        
        
          
            
              
                →
              
              
                
                  f
                  c
                  l
                
              
            
          
        
        
          A
          
            2
          
        
      
    
    {\textstyle A_{1}{\stackrel {\scriptscriptstyle fcl}{\rightarrow }}A_{2}}
  
 and 
  
    
      
        
          B
          
            1
          
        
        
          
            
              
                →
              
              
                
                  f
                  c
                  l
                
              
            
          
        
        
          B
          
            2
          
        
      
    
    {\textstyle B_{1}{\stackrel {\scriptscriptstyle fcl}{\rightarrow }}B_{2}}
  

  
    
      
        
        ⟹
        
      
    
    {\textstyle \implies }
  
 
  
    
      
        
          A
          
            1
          
        
        ∪
        
          B
          
            1
          
        
        
          
            
              
                →
              
              
                
                  f
                  c
                  l
                
              
            
          
        
        
          A
          
            2
          
        
        ∪
        
          B
          
            2
          
        
      
    
    {\textstyle A_{1}\cup B_{1}{\stackrel {\scriptscriptstyle fcl}{\rightarrow }}A_{2}\cup B_{2}}
  


  
    
      
        ∵
        (
        ∏
        
          A
          
            1
          
        
        )
        ⋅
        (
        ∏
        
          B
          
            1
          
        
        )
        ≡
        ∏
        (
        
          A
          
            1
          
        
        ∪
        
          B
          
            1
          
        
        )
      
    
    {\textstyle \because (\prod A_{1})\cdot (\prod B_{1})\equiv \prod (A_{1}\cup B_{1})}
  
 and 
  
    
      
        (
        ∏
        
          A
          
            2
          
        
        )
        ⋅
        (
        ∏
        
          B
          
            2
          
        
        )
        ≡
        ∏
        (
        
          A
          
            2
          
        
        ∪
        
          B
          
            2
          
        
        )
      
    
    {\textstyle (\prod A_{2})\cdot (\prod B_{2})\equiv \prod (A_{2}\cup B_{2})}
  
.

The Armstrong axioms are not suited for $A\stackrel{\scriptscriptstyle rsl}{\rightarrow} B$ which requires $A\subseteq B$. This is in contrast to $A\stackrel{\scriptscriptstyle fcl}{\rightarrow} B$ for which Armstrong's reflexivity is implemented by $A\supseteq B$. Nevertheless, a similar composition may occur but signify a different rule from (1). Note that one also arrives at

(2) 
  
    
      
        (
        
          μ
          
            1
          
        
        →
        
          μ
          
            2
          
        
        )
      
    
    {\textstyle (\mu _{1}\rightarrow \mu _{2})}
  
 and 
  
    
      
        (
        
          ν
          
            1
          
        
        →
        
          ν
          
            2
          
        
        )
      
    
    {\textstyle (\nu _{1}\rightarrow \nu _{2})}
  
 
  
    
      
        
        ⟹
        
      
    
    {\textstyle \implies }
  
 
  
    
      
        (
        
          μ
          
            1
          
        
        +
        
          ν
          
            1
          
        
        →
        
          μ
          
            2
          
        
        +
        
          ν
          
            2
          
        
        )
      
    
    {\textstyle (\mu _{1}+\nu _{1}\rightarrow \mu _{2}+\nu _{2})}
  

since 
  
    
      
        
          μ
          
            1
          
          
            R
          
        
        ⊆
        
          μ
          
            2
          
          
            R
          
        
      
    
    {\textstyle \mu _{1}^{R}\subseteq \mu _{2}^{R}}
  
 and 
  
    
      
        
          ν
          
            1
          
          
            R
          
        
        ⊆
        
          ν
          
            2
          
          
            R
          
        
      
    
    {\textstyle \nu _{1}^{R}\subseteq \nu _{2}^{R}}
  
 
  
    
      
        
        ⟹
        
      
    
    {\textstyle \implies }
  
 
  
    
      
        (
        
          μ
          
            1
          
        
        +
        
          ν
          
            1
          
        
        
          )
          
            R
          
        
        ⊆
        (
        
          μ
          
            2
          
        
        +
        
          ν
          
            2
          
        
        
          )
          
            R
          
        
      
    
    {\textstyle (\mu _{1}+\nu _{1})^{R}\subseteq (\mu _{2}+\nu _{2})^{R}}
  
, which gives rise to
(2') 
  
    
      
        
          A
          
            1
          
        
        
          
            
              
                →
              
              
                
                  r
                  s
                  l
                
              
            
          
        
        
          A
          
            2
          
        
      
    
    {\textstyle A_{1}{\stackrel {\scriptscriptstyle rsl}{\rightarrow }}A_{2}}
  
 and 
  
    
      
        
          B
          
            1
          
        
        
          
            
              
                →
              
              
                
                  r
                  s
                  l
                
              
            
          
        
        
          B
          
            2
          
        
      
    
    {\textstyle B_{1}{\stackrel {\scriptscriptstyle rsl}{\rightarrow }}B_{2}}
  
 
  
    
      
        
        ⟹
        
      
    
    {\textstyle \implies }
  

  
    
      
        
          A
          
            1
          
        
        ∪
        
          A
          
            2
          
        
        
          
            
              
                →
              
              
                
                  r
                  s
                  l
                
              
            
          
        
        
          B
          
            1
          
        
        ∪
        
          B
          
            2
          
        
      
    
    {\textstyle A_{1}\cup A_{2}{\stackrel {\scriptscriptstyle rsl}{\rightarrow }}B_{1}\cup B_{2}}
  
 whenever 
  
    
      
        
          μ
          
            1
          
        
        =
        ∑
        
          A
          
            1
          
        
      
    
    {\textstyle \mu _{1}=\sum A_{1}}
  
, 
  
    
      
        
          ν
          
            1
          
        
        =
        ∑
        
          B
          
            1
          
        
      
    
    {\textstyle \nu _{1}=\sum B_{1}}
  
, 
  
    
      
        
          μ
          
            2
          
        
        =
        ∑
        
          A
          
            2
          
        
      
    
    {\textstyle \mu _{2}=\sum A_{2}}
  
 and 
  
    
      
        
          ν
          
            2
          
        
        =
        ∑
        
          B
          
            2
          
        
      
    
    {\textstyle \nu _{2}=\sum B_{2}}
  
.

== Example ==
For concreteness, consider the example depicted by Table 2, which has been originally adopted for clarification of the RSL but worked out for the GCL.

Table 2: An example formal context. Since the objects $3\mbox{ and }4$ are equipped with the same property, they belong to the same minimal discernible object set. One may choose $D_1=\{1\}$, $D_2=\{2\}$, $D_3=\{3,4\}$, $D_4=\{5 \}$ and $D_5=\{ 6\}$. Note that the fully extended version $F^\ast (G,M^\ast)$ comprises $2^{2^{|M|}}$columns, where the cardinality of attribute set $|M|=5$. The table is huge, yet manageable when one deals with the GCL.
	$F(G,M)$					$2^{2^5}-5 \mbox{ more columns}$					
$M^\ast$ $G$	$a$	$b$	$c$	$d$	$e$	$\neg a+b$	$\neg b$	$a+\neg c+d\neg e$	$\ldots$	${\quad }$	$\ldots$
1	$\times$		$\times$	$\times$	$\times$		$\times$	$\times$			
2	$\times$		$\times$				$\times$	$\times$			
3		$\times$			$\times$	$\times$		$\times$			
4		$\times$			$\times$	$\times$		$\times$			
5	$\times$						$\times$	$\times$			
6	$\times$	$\times$			$\times$	$\times$		$\times$			

=== The GCL structure and the identifications of FCL and RSL on the GCL ===
- The determinations of the nodes of GCL for Table 2 are straightforward, as is depicted in Fig.4. For example, one may read out
  Fig. 4: Readout of GCL from a formal context. On each node, a binary string is to denote the extent, e.g., 01010 denotes the object set $D_2\cup D_4$ i.e. $\{2,5\}$, 00100 denotes $D_3$ i.e. $\{ 3,4\}$. In this figure, $\eta(\{2,5\})$ and $\rho (\{2,5\})$ are shown. Accordingly, one may identify all the lower and upper bounds of intents in the expressions the contextual truth and falsity ($1_\eta$ and $0_\rho$), respectively.

  
    
      
        η
        (
        {
        2
        ,
        5
        }
        )
      
    
    {\textstyle \eta (\{2,5\})}
  
 
  
    
      
        =
        η
        (
        
          D
          
            2
          
        
        ∪
        
          D
          
            4
          
        
        )
      
    
    {\textstyle =\eta (D_{2}\cup D_{4})}
  

  
    
      
        =
        η
        (
        
          D
          
            2
          
        
        )
        +
        η
        (
        
          D
          
            4
          
        
        )
      
    
    {\textstyle =\eta (D_{2})+\eta (D_{4})}
  

  
    
      
        =
        η
        (
        {
        2
        }
        )
        +
        η
        (
        {
        5
        }
        )
      
    
    {\textstyle =\eta (\{2\})+\eta (\{5\})}
  

  
    
      
        =
        a
        ¬
        b
        c
        ¬
        d
        ¬
        e
        +
        a
        ¬
        b
        ¬
        c
        ¬
        d
        ¬
        e
      
    
    {\textstyle =a\neg bc\neg d\neg e+a\neg b\neg c\neg d\neg e}
  

  
    
      
        =
        a
        ¬
        b
        ¬
        d
        ¬
        e
      
    
    {\textstyle =a\neg b\neg d\neg e}
  
,

  
    
      
        ρ
        (
        {
        2
        ,
        5
        }
        )
        =
        ¬
        η
        (
        {
        1
        ,
        3
        ,
        4
        ,
        6
        }
        )
      
    
    {\textstyle \rho (\{2,5\})=\neg \eta (\{1,3,4,6\})}
  

  
    
      
        =
        (
        ¬
        a
        +
        b
        +
        ¬
        c
        +
        ¬
        d
        +
        ¬
        e
        )
      
    
    {\textstyle =(\neg a+b+\neg c+\neg d+\neg e)}
  

  
    
      
        (
        ¬
        b
        +
        c
        +
        d
        +
        ¬
        e
        )
      
    
    {\textstyle (\neg b+c+d+\neg e)}
  
,

  
    
      
        η
        (
        {
        3
        ,
        4
        }
        )
      
    
    {\textstyle \eta (\{3,4\})}
  

  
    
      
        =
        η
        (
        
          D
          
            3
          
        
        )
      
    
    {\textstyle =\eta (D_{3})}
  

  
    
      
        =
        ¬
        a
        b
        ¬
        c
        ¬
        d
        e
      
    
    {\textstyle =\neg ab\neg c\neg de}
  
, and so forth.

Clearly, one may also check that $\rho(\{2,5\})=\neg \eta(\{1,3,4,6\})=\eta(\{2,5\})+0_\rho$.

- To rediscover the original FCL and RSL see Fig. 5. Observe, e.g.,

  
    
      
        η
        (
        {
        1
        ,
        2
        ,
        5
        ,
        6
        }
        )
        =
        a
        ¬
        b
        c
        d
        e
      
    
    {\textstyle \eta (\{1,2,5,6\})=a\neg bcde}
  

  
    
      
        +
        a
        ¬
        b
        c
        ¬
        d
        ¬
        e
      
    
    {\textstyle +a\neg bc\neg d\neg e}
  

  
    
      
        +
        a
        ¬
        b
        ¬
        c
        ¬
        d
        ¬
        e
      
    
    {\textstyle +a\neg b\neg c\neg d\neg e}
  

  
    
      
        +
        a
        b
        ¬
        c
        ¬
        d
        e
      
    
    {\textstyle +ab\neg c\neg de}
  
 
  
    
      
        =
        a
        (
        ¬
        b
        +
        e
        )
      
    
    {\textstyle =a(\neg b+e)}
  

  
    
      
        (
        ¬
        d
        +
        e
        )
      
    
    {\textstyle (\neg d+e)}
  

  
    
      
        (
        ¬
        b
        +
        ¬
        c
        )
      
    
    {\textstyle (\neg b+\neg c)}
  

  
    
      
        (
        ¬
        b
        +
        ¬
        d
        )
      
    
    {\textstyle (\neg b+\neg d)}
  

  
    
      
        (
        b
        +
        c
        +
        ¬
        e
        )
      
    
    {\textstyle (b+c+\neg e)}
  

  
    
      
        (
        c
        +
        ¬
        d
        )
      
    
    {\textstyle (c+\neg d)}
  

  
    
      
        (
        b
        +
        d
        +
        ¬
        e
        )
      
    
    {\textstyle (b+d+\neg e)}
  

  
    
      
        (
        ¬
        c
        +
        d
        +
        ¬
        e
        )
      
    
    {\textstyle (\neg c+d+\neg e)}
  
,

  
    
      
        ρ
        (
        {
        1
        ,
        2
        ,
        5
        ,
        6
        }
        )
      
    
    {\textstyle \rho (\{1,2,5,6\})}
  

  
    
      
        =
        a
      
    
    {\textstyle =a}
  

  
    
      
        +
        ¬
        b
      
    
    {\textstyle +\neg b}
  

  
    
      
        +
        c
      
    
    {\textstyle +c}
  

  
    
      
        +
        d
      
    
    {\textstyle +d}
  

  
    
      
        +
        ¬
        e
      
    
    {\textstyle +\neg e}
  

  
    
      
        =
        ¬
        η
        (
        {
        3
        ,
        4
        }
        )
      
    
    {\textstyle =\neg \eta (\{3,4\})}
  
.

Within the expression of $\eta(\{1,2,5,6\})$ it can be seen that ${a}^R=\lbrace a \rbrace^I$$=\lbrace 1,2,5,6 \rbrace$, while within $\rho(\{1,2,5,6\})$ it can be seen $( a+ c+d )^R$$=\lbrace {a,c,d} \rbrace^\Diamond$$=\lbrace 1,2,5,6 \rbrace$. Therefore, one finds out the concepts $(\lbrace 1,2,5,6 \rbrace,\lbrace a\rbrace)$ for FCL and $(\lbrace 1,2,5,6 \rbrace,\lbrace a,c,d\rbrace)$ for RSL. By contrast,

  
    
      
        η
        (
        {
        1
        ,
        6
        }
        )
      
    
    {\textstyle \eta (\{1,6\})}
  
 
  
    
      
        =
        a
        e
        (
        ¬
        b
        c
        d
        +
        b
        ¬
        c
        ¬
        d
        )
      
    
    {\textstyle =ae(\neg bcd+b\neg c\neg d)}
  
, 
  
    
      
        ρ
        (
        {
        1
        ,
        6
        }
        )
        =
        
          d
        
        +
        a
        b
        +
        c
        e
      
    
    {\textstyle \rho (\lbrace 1,6\rbrace )={d}+ab+ce}
  

  
    
      
        +
        ¬
        b
        e
      
    
    {\textstyle +\neg be}
  

  
    
      
        +
        ¬
        a
        ¬
        e
      
    
    {\textstyle +\neg a\neg e}
  

with $(ae)^R=\{a,e\}^I$ $=\{ 1,6\}$ gives rise to the concept $(\lbrace 1,6 \rbrace,\lbrace a,e\rbrace)$ for FCL however fails to provide an extent for RSL because $d^R\equiv \lbrace d\rbrace^\Diamond= \lbrace 1\rbrace\neq \lbrace 1,6\rbrace$.

Fig. 5: The GCL constructed according to the formal context given in Table 2. The circled points are nodes existing on the FCL, whereas the bold ones belong to the RSL, also cf. Fig. 3.

=== Implication relations in general ===
- The meanings of $A\stackrel{\scriptscriptstyle fcl}{\rightarrow} B$ and $A\stackrel{\scriptscriptstyle rsl}{\rightarrow} B$ are essentially different.

  
    
      
        {
        c
        ,
        d
        }
        
          
            
              
                →
              
              
                
                  f
                  c
                  l
                
              
            
          
        
        {
        a
        }
      
    
    {\textstyle \{c,d\}{\stackrel {\scriptscriptstyle fcl}{\rightarrow }}\{a\}}
  
 and 
  
    
      
        {
        c
        ,
        d
        }
        
          
            
              
                →
              
              
                
                  r
                  s
                  l
                
              
            
          
        
        {
        a
        }
      
    
    {\textstyle \{c,d\}{\stackrel {\scriptscriptstyle rsl}{\rightarrow }}\{a\}}
  
 denote 
  
    
      
        c
        ⋅
        d
        →
        a
      
    
    {\textstyle c\cdot d\rightarrow a}
  
 and 
  
    
      
        c
        +
        d
        →
        a
      
    
    {\textstyle c+d\rightarrow a}
  
, respectively.

For the present case, the above relations can be examined via the auxiliary formula:

  
    
      
        c
        ⋅
        d
        ⋅
        
          1
          
            η
          
        
        ≤
        a
        ⋅
        
          1
          
            η
          
        
      
    
    {\textstyle c\cdot d\cdot 1_{\eta }\leq a\cdot 1_{\eta }}
  
 (or 
  
    
      
        c
        ⋅
        d
        +
        
          0
          
            ρ
          
        
        ≤
        a
        +
        
          0
          
            ρ
          
        
      
    
    {\textstyle c\cdot d+0_{\rho }\leq a+0_{\rho }}
  
), 
  
    
      
        (
        c
        +
        d
        )
        ⋅
        
          1
          
            η
          
        
        ≤
        a
        ⋅
        
          1
          
            η
          
        
      
    
    {\textstyle (c+d)\cdot 1_{\eta }\leq a\cdot 1_{\eta }}
  
 (or 
  
    
      
        c
        +
        d
        +
        
          0
          
            ρ
          
        
        ≤
        a
        +
        
          0
          
            ρ
          
        
      
    
    {\textstyle c+d+0_{\rho }\leq a+0_{\rho }}
  
).

- $A\stackrel{\scriptscriptstyle fcl}{\rightarrow} B$ and $A\stackrel{\scriptscriptstyle rsl}{\rightarrow} B$ are equivalent when both $A\mbox{ and }B$ are reduced to sets of single element.

Both 
  
    
      
        {
        c
        }
        
          
            
              
                →
              
              
                
                  f
                  c
                  l
                
              
            
          
        
        {
        a
        }
      
    
    {\textstyle \{c\}{\stackrel {\scriptscriptstyle fcl}{\rightarrow }}\{a\}}
  
 and 
  
    
      
        {
        c
        }
        
          
            
              
                →
              
              
                
                  r
                  s
                  l
                
              
            
          
        
        {
        a
        }
      
    
    {\textstyle \{c\}{\stackrel {\scriptscriptstyle rsl}{\rightarrow }}\{a\}}
  
, according to the formal context of Table 2, are interpreted as 
  
    
      
        c
        →
        a
      
    
    {\textstyle c\rightarrow a}
  
, which means 
  
    
      
        {
        c
        }
        
          
            
              
                →
              
              
                
                  f
                  c
                  l
                
              
            
          
        
        {
        a
        }
      
    
    {\textstyle \{c\}{\stackrel {\scriptscriptstyle fcl}{\rightarrow }}\{a\}}
  
 based on 
  
    
      
        {
        c
        
          }
          
            I
          
        
        ⊂
        {
        a
        
          }
          
            I
          
        
      
    
    {\textstyle \{c\}^{I}\subset \{a\}^{I}}
  
and 
  
    
      
        {
        c
        }
        
          
            
              
                →
              
              
                
                  r
                  s
                  l
                
              
            
          
        
        {
        a
        }
      
    
    {\textstyle \{c\}{\stackrel {\scriptscriptstyle rsl}{\rightarrow }}\{a\}}
  
 based on 
  
    
      
        {
        c
        
          }
          
            ◊
          
        
        ⊂
        {
        a
        
          }
          
            ◊
          
        
      
    
    {\textstyle \{c\}^{\Diamond }\subset \{a\}^{\Diamond }}
  
.

Note that $c^R=\{c\}^I=\{c\}^\Diamond$$=\{1,2\}$ $\subset \{1,2,5,6\}$$=a^R$$=\{a\}^I$$=\{a\}^\Diamond$. Moreover, $c\rightarrow a$ entails both $c\rightarrow c\cdot a$ and $c+a\rightarrow a$, which correspond to $\{c\}\stackrel{\scriptscriptstyle fcl}{\rightarrow} \{a,c\}$ and $\{c,a\}\stackrel{\scriptscriptstyle rsl}{\rightarrow} \{a\}$, respectively.

- The single formula suffices to generate all the informative implications, where one may choose any attribute in $M^\ast$ as the antecedent or consequent.

(1) With 
  
    
      
        μ
        →
        μ
        ⋅
        
          1
          
            η
          
        
      
    
    {\textstyle \mu \rightarrow \mu \cdot 1_{\eta }}
  
 one may infer the properties of objects of interest from the condition 
  
    
      
        
          1
          
            η
          
        
      
    
    {\textstyle 1_{\eta }}
  
 by specifying 
  
    
      
        μ
      
    
    {\textstyle \mu }
  
, thereby incorporating abundant informative implications as equivalent relations between any pair of attributes within the interval 
  
    
      
        [
        μ
        ⋅
        
          1
          
            η
          
        
        ,
        μ
        ]
      
    
    {\displaystyle [\mu \cdot 1_{\eta },\mu ]}
  
, i.e., 
  
    
      
        ∀
        
          μ
          
            1
          
        
        ∀
        
          μ
          
            2
          
        
      
    
    {\textstyle \forall \mu _{1}\forall \mu _{2}}
  
 
  
    
      
        
          μ
          
            1
          
        
        ↔
        
          μ
          
            2
          
        
      
    
    {\textstyle \mu _{1}\leftrightarrow \mu _{2}}
  
 if 
  
    
      
        μ
        ⋅
        
          1
          
            η
          
        
        ≤
        
          μ
          
            1
          
        
        ≤
        μ
      
    
    {\displaystyle \mu \cdot 1_{\eta }\leq \mu _{1}\leq \mu }
  
 and 
  
    
      
        μ
        ⋅
        
          1
          
            η
          
        
        ≤
        
          μ
          
            2
          
        
        ≤
        μ
      
    
    {\displaystyle \mu \cdot 1_{\eta }\leq \mu _{2}\leq \mu }
  
. Note that 
  
    
      
        μ
        →
        μ
        ⋅
        
          1
          
            η
          
        
      
    
    {\textstyle \mu \rightarrow \mu \cdot 1_{\eta }}
  
 entails 
  
    
      
        μ
        ↔
        μ
        ⋅
        
          1
          
            η
          
        
      
    
    {\textstyle \mu \leftrightarrow \mu \cdot 1_{\eta }}
  
 since 
  
    
      
        μ
        ⋅
        
          1
          
            η
          
        
        ≤
        μ
      
    
    {\textstyle \mu \cdot 1_{\eta }\leq \mu }
  
.

For instance, by $(c+d)\cdot 1_\eta$ $=c\cdot 1_\eta$ $=a\neg bc(de+\neg d\neg e)$ the relation $c+d$ $\rightarrow a\neg bc(de+\neg d\neg e)$ is neither of the type $A\stackrel{\scriptscriptstyle fcl}{\rightarrow} B$ nor of the type $A\stackrel{\scriptscriptstyle rsl}{\rightarrow} B$. Nevertheless, one may also derive, e.g., $c+d\rightarrow c$, $c+d\rightarrow a$ and $cd\rightarrow a$, which are $\{ c, d \}\stackrel{\scriptscriptstyle rsl}{\rightarrow} \{ c \}$, $\{c, d\}\stackrel{\scriptscriptstyle rsl}{\rightarrow} \{a\}$ and $\{c, d\}\stackrel{\scriptscriptstyle fcl}{\rightarrow} \{a\}$, respectively. As a further interesting implication $c+d \rightarrow \neg b(de+ \neg d\neg e)$ entails $c+d \rightarrow \neg b \cdot ( e \leftrightarrow d )$ by means of material implication. Namely, for the objects carrying the property $c$ or $d$, $\neg b$ must hold and, in addition, objects carrying the property $e$ must also carry the property $d$ and vice versa.

(1') Alternatively, the equivalent formula 
  
    
      
        μ
        +
        
          0
          
            ρ
          
        
        →
        μ
      
    
    {\textstyle \mu +0_{\rho }\rightarrow \mu }
  
 can be employed to specify the objects of particular interest. In effect, 
  
    
      
        ∀
        
          μ
          
            1
          
        
        ∀
        
          μ
          
            2
          
        
      
    
    {\textstyle \forall \mu _{1}\forall \mu _{2}}
  
 
  
    
      
        
          μ
          
            1
          
        
        ↔
        
          μ
          
            2
          
        
      
    
    {\textstyle \mu _{1}\leftrightarrow \mu _{2}}
  
 if 
  
    
      
        μ
        ≤
        
          μ
          
            1
          
        
        ≤
        μ
        +
        
          0
          
            ρ
          
        
      
    
    {\displaystyle \mu \leq \mu _{1}\leq \mu +0_{\rho }}
  
 and 
  
    
      
        μ
        ≤
        
          μ
          
            2
          
        
        ≤
        μ
        +
        
          0
          
            ρ
          
        
      
    
    {\displaystyle \mu \leq \mu _{2}\leq \mu +0_{\rho }}
  
.

One may be interested in the properties inferring a particular consequent, say, $e\rightarrow a$. Consider $\mu:=\neg e+a$ $\iff e\rightarrow a$ giving rise to $\mu+ 0_\rho$ $=a+\neg b+c+d+\neg e$ according to Table 2. Clearly, with $\neg e+a$ $\leq \mu_1$$\leq a+\neg b+c+d+\neg e$ one has $\mu_1 \leftrightarrow ( e \rightarrow a )$. This gives rise to many possible antecedents such as $(e\rightarrow a+c+d) \rightarrow (e\rightarrow a)$, $(b\rightarrow (e\rightarrow a+c )) \rightarrow (e\rightarrow a)$, $(e\rightarrow (b \rightarrow a+c )) \rightarrow (e\rightarrow a)$, $(b\rightarrow (e\rightarrow a+c+d)) \rightarrow (e\rightarrow a)$ and so forth.

(2) 
  
    
      
        
          1
          
            η
          
        
      
    
    {\textstyle 1_{\eta }}
  
 governs all the implications extractable from the formal context by means of (1) and (1'). Indeed, it plays the role of canonical basis with one single implication relation.

$1_\eta$ can be understood as ${\bf 1}\rightarrow 1_\eta$ or equivalently $0_\rho\rightarrow {\bf 0}$, which turns out be the only non-redundant implication one needs to deduce all the informative implications from any formal context. The basis ${\bf 1}\rightarrow 1_\eta$ or $0_\rho\rightarrow {\bf 0}$ suffices the deduction of all implications as follows. While $\forall \mu$ ${\bf 1}\rightarrow 1_\eta$$\implies \mu \rightarrow \mu 1_\eta$ and $\forall \nu$ $0_\rho\rightarrow {\bf 0}$$\implies \nu+0_\rho \rightarrow \nu$, choosing either $\mu=\rho(X)$ or $\nu=\eta(X)$ gives rise to $\rho(X)\rightarrow \eta(X)$. Notably, this encompasses (1) and (1') by means of $\mu\cdot 1_\eta\equiv \eta(\mu^R)$$\leq \mu$ $\leq \rho(\mu^R)\equiv \mu+0_\rho$ for any $\mu$, where $\mu^R$ can be identified with some $X$ corresponding to one of the 32 nodes on the GCL in Fig. 4.

$\rho(X)\rightarrow \eta(X)$ develops equivalence, at each single node, for all attributes contained within the interval $[ \eta (X), \rho(X) ]$. Moreover, informative implications could also relate different nodes via Hypothetical syllogism by invoking tautology. Typically, $\forall \mu_1\in [X_1]_F\forall\mu_2\in [X_2]_F$ $\mu_1\rightarrow\mu_2$ whenever $( X_1,[X_1]_F)$ $\leq ( X_2,[X_2]_F)$. This corresponds to the cases considered in (1'): $(b\rightarrow c) \rightarrow (e\rightarrow a)$, $c \rightarrow (e\rightarrow a)$, $\neg b \rightarrow (e\rightarrow a)$ etc. Explicitly, $( b\rightarrow c )\rightarrow (e\rightarrow a)$ is based upon $\neg b+c\in [\{1,2,5\}]_F$ and $\neg e+a\in [\{1,2,5,6\}]_F$ where $\{1,2,5\}\subseteq\{1,2,5,6\}$. Note that $\neg b +c\leftrightarrow \rho(\{1,2,5\})$$\leftrightarrow \eta (\{1,2,5\})$ and $\neg e+a\leftrightarrow \rho(\{1,2,5,6\})$$\leftrightarrow \eta (\{ 1,2,5,6 \})$ while $\rho(\{1,2,5\})$$\leq \rho (\{1,2,5,6\})$ (also $\eta(\{ 1,2,5 \}) \leq \eta(\{ 1,2,5,6 \})$). Therefore, $( b\rightarrow c )\rightarrow (e\rightarrow a)$. Similarly, $c\in [\{1,2\}]_F$ with $\{1,2\} \subseteq\{1,2,5,6\}$ gives $c \rightarrow (e\rightarrow a)$.

Indeed, ${\bf 1}\rightarrow 1_\eta$ or equivalently $0_\rho\rightarrow {\bf 0}$ plays the role of canonical basis with one single implication relation.
