= Rudolf Wille =

German mathematician (1937–2017)

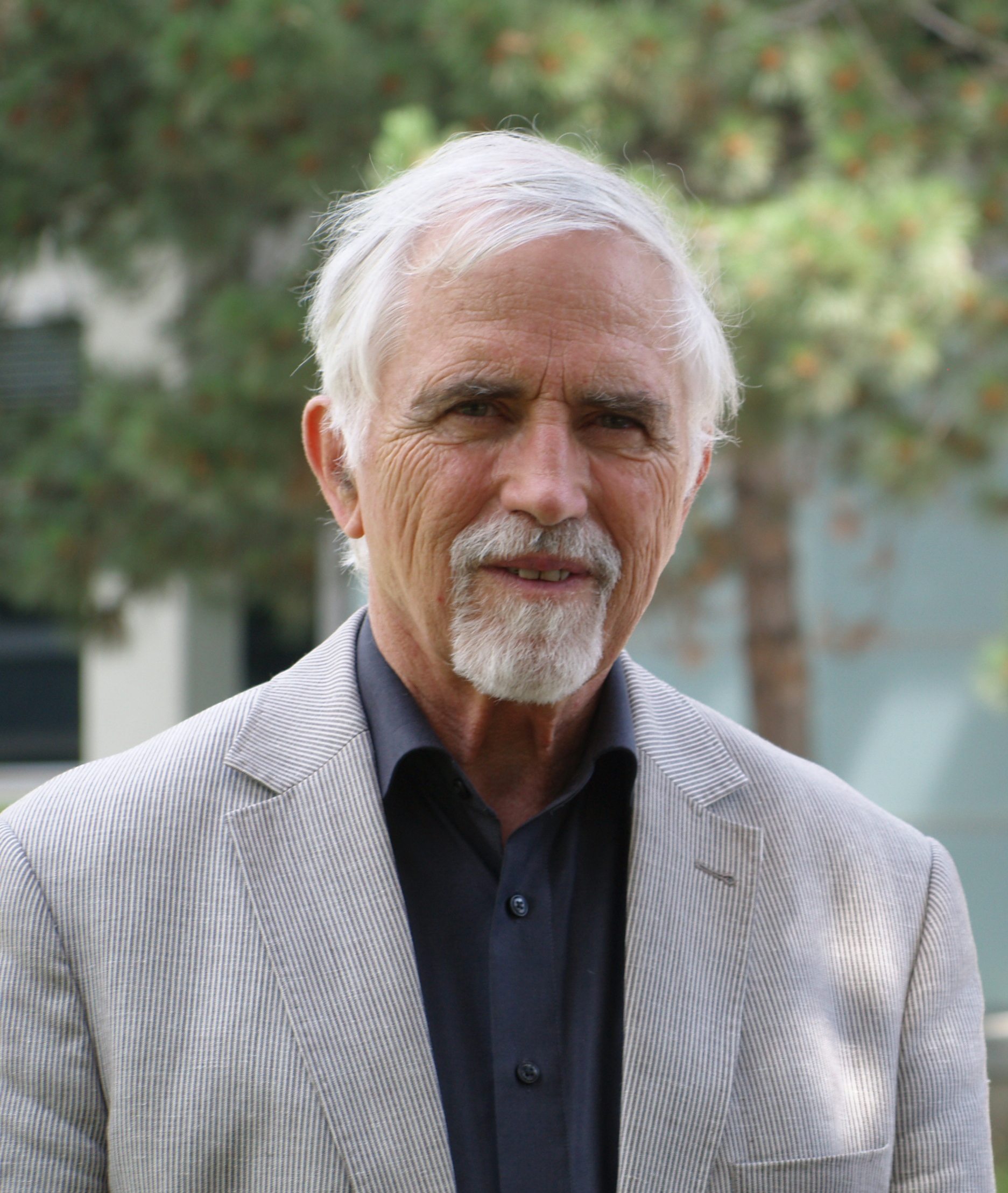
Rudolf Wille in 2012.

Rudolf Wille (2 November 1937 – 22 January 2017) was a German mathematician and was professor of General Algebra from 1970 to 2003 at Technische Universität Darmstadt (TU Darmstadt). His most celebrated work is the invention of formal concept analysis, an unsupervised machine learning technique that applies mathematical lattice theory to organize data based on objects and their shared attributes.

An accomplished musician and has also made contributions to Mathematics in Music, Mathematical Pedagogy and the Philosophy of Science, Wille played an active leadership role in the concept lattice research community.

Wille was a member of the Board of Directors of the Institute for Philosophy at TU Darmstadt from 1976. From 1983, was leader of the research group on Formal concept analysis and from 1993 Chairman of the "Ernst Schröder Center for Conceptual Knowledge Engineering". Wille was also a founding member of the Center for Inter-Disciplinary Research in Darmstadt and maintained a footprint in other research groups around the world as a visiting consulting/scholar.

Wille's research interests included algebra, order and lattice theory, foundations of geometry, discrete mathematics, measurement theory, mathematics in music, philosophy of science, conceptual knowledge engineering and contextual logic.

A significant international community of researchers follow Wille's work on Formal concept analysis, the main forums being the International Conferences on Formal Concept Analysis (ICFCA), Conceptual Structures (see also Conceptual graphs) (ICCS) and Concept Lattices and their Application (CLA) conferences. The first two are published in the Lecture Notes in Computer Science and the latter is a multi-stage conference that produces journal papers.

Wille oversaw more than 100 German "Diplom- und Staatsexamenarbeiten" in Mathematics, 51 PhD dissertations, and 8 Postdoctoral "habilitation" qualifications.

== Work ==
Wille authored more than 250 scientific publications and co-authored the highly cited and influential textbook on Formal concept analysis with his longtime collaborator (and former PhD student) Bernhard Ganter who is now Professor Emeritus of Mathematics at TU Dresden:

- B. Ganter, R. Wille (1999) Formal Concept Analysis: Mathematical Foundations, Springer-Verlag, ISBN 3540278915.
