= Decision-theoretic rough sets =

Concept in the mathematical theory of decisions

In the mathematical theory of decisions, decision-theoretic rough sets (DTRS) is a probabilistic extension of rough set classification. First created in 1990 by Dr. Yiyu Yao, the extension makes use of loss functions to derive $\textstyle \alpha$ and $\textstyle \beta$ region parameters. Like rough sets, the lower and upper approximations of a set are used.

== Definitions ==
The following contains the basic principles of decision-theoretic rough sets.

=== Conditional risk ===
Using the Bayesian decision procedure, the decision-theoretic rough set (DTRS) approach allows for minimum-risk decision making based on observed evidence. Let $\textstyle A=\{a_1,\ldots,a_m\}$ be a finite set of $\textstyle m$ possible actions and let $\textstyle \Omega=\{w_1,\ldots, w_s\}$ be a finite set of $s$ states. $\textstyle P(w_j\mid[x])$ is calculated as the conditional probability of an object $\textstyle x$ being in state $\textstyle w_j$ given the object description $\textstyle [x]$. $\textstyle \lambda(a_i\mid w_j)$ denotes the loss, or cost, for performing action $\textstyle a_i$ when the state is $\textstyle w_j$. The expected loss (conditional risk) associated with taking action $\textstyle a_i$ is given by:

$$R(a_i\mid [x]) = \sum_{j=1}^s \lambda(a_i\mid w_j)P(w_j\mid[x]).$$

Object classification with the approximation operators can be fitted into the Bayesian decision framework. The set of actions is given by $\textstyle A=\{a_P,a_N,a_B\}$, where $\textstyle a_P$, $\textstyle a_N$, and $\textstyle a_B$ represent the three actions in classifying an object into POS($\textstyle A$), NEG($\textstyle A$), and BND($\textstyle A$) respectively. To indicate whether an element is in $\textstyle A$ or not in $\textstyle A$, the set of states is given by $\textstyle \Omega=\{A,A^c\}$. Let $\textstyle \lambda(a_\diamond\mid A)$ denote the loss incurred by taking action $\textstyle a_\diamond$ when an object belongs to $\textstyle A$, and let $\textstyle \lambda(a_\diamond\mid A^c)$ denote the loss incurred by take the same action when the object belongs to $\textstyle A^c$.

=== Loss functions ===
Let $\textstyle \lambda_{PP}$ denote the loss function for classifying an object in $\textstyle A$ into the POS region, $\textstyle \lambda_{BP}$ denote the loss function for classifying an object in $\textstyle A$ into the BND region, and let $\textstyle \lambda_{NP}$ denote the loss function for classifying an object in $\textstyle A$ into the NEG region. A loss function $\textstyle \lambda_{\diamond N}$ denotes the loss of classifying an object that does not belong to $\textstyle A$ into the regions specified by $\textstyle \diamond$.

Taking individual can be associated with the expected loss $\textstyle R(a_\diamond\mid[x])$actions and can be expressed as:

$$\textstyle R(a_P\mid[x]) = \lambda_{PP}P(A\mid[x]) + \lambda_{PN}P(A^c\mid[x]),$$

$$\textstyle R(a_N\mid[x]) = \lambda_{NP}P(A\mid[x]) + \lambda_{NN}P(A^c\mid[x]),$$

$$\textstyle R(a_B\mid[x]) = \lambda_{BP}P(A\mid[x]) + \lambda_{BN}P(A^c\mid[x]),$$

where $\textstyle \lambda_{\diamond P}=\lambda(a_\diamond\mid A)$, $\textstyle \lambda_{\diamond N}=\lambda(a_\diamond\mid A^c)$, and $\textstyle \diamond=P$, $\textstyle N$, or $\textstyle B$.

=== Minimum-risk decision rules ===
If we consider the loss functions $\textstyle \lambda_{PP} \leq \lambda_{BP} < \lambda_{NP}$ and $\textstyle \lambda_{NN} \leq \lambda_{BN} < \lambda_{PN}$, the following decision rules are formulated (P, N, B):

- P: If $\textstyle P(A\mid[x]) \geq \gamma$ and $\textstyle P(A\mid[x]) \geq \alpha$, decide POS($\textstyle A$);
- N: If $\textstyle P(A\mid[x]) \leq \beta$ and $\textstyle P(A\mid[x]) \leq \gamma$, decide NEG($\textstyle A$);
- B: If $\textstyle \beta \leq P(A\mid[x]) \leq \alpha$, decide BND($\textstyle A$);

where,

$$\alpha = \frac{\lambda_{PN} - \lambda_{BN}}{(\lambda_{BP} - \lambda_{BN}) - (\lambda_{PP}-\lambda_{PN})},$$

$$\gamma = \frac{\lambda_{PN} - \lambda_{NN}}{(\lambda_{NP} - \lambda_{NN}) - (\lambda_{PP}-\lambda_{PN})},$$

$$\beta = \frac{\lambda_{BN} - \lambda_{NN}}{(\lambda_{NP} - \lambda_{NN}) - (\lambda_{BP}-\lambda_{BN})}.$$

The $\textstyle \alpha$, $\textstyle \beta$, and $\textstyle \gamma$ values define the three different regions, giving us an associated risk for classifying an object. When $\textstyle \alpha > \beta$, we get $\textstyle \alpha > \gamma > \beta$ and can simplify (P, N, B) into (P1, N1, B1):

- P1: If $\textstyle P(A\mid [x]) \geq \alpha$, decide POS($\textstyle A$);
- N1: If $\textstyle P(A\mid[x]) \leq \beta$, decide NEG($\textstyle A$);
- B1: If $\textstyle \beta < P(A\mid[x]) < \alpha$, decide BND($\textstyle A$).

When $\textstyle \alpha = \beta = \gamma$, we can simplify the rules (P-B) into (P2-B2), which divide the regions based solely on $\textstyle \alpha$:

- P2: If $\textstyle P(A\mid[x]) > \alpha$, decide POS($\textstyle A$);
- N2: If $\textstyle P(A\mid[x]) < \alpha$, decide NEG($\textstyle A$);
- B2: If $\textstyle P(A\mid[x]) = \alpha$, decide BND($\textstyle A$).

Data mining, feature selection, information retrieval, and classifications are just some of the applications in which the DTRS approach has been successfully used.

== See also ==
- Rough sets
- Granular computing
- Fuzzy set theory
