= CN2 =

CN2 may refer to:

- CN2 algorithm for rule induction
- cn|2, a weather, sports and political news cable channel owned by Time Warner Cable in former Insight Communications territories
- Optic nerve (CN2), second cranial nerve
- Cartoon Network Too, a defunct British channel owned by The WB.
- ChinaNet Next Carrying Network, one type of the Internet routes provided by China Telecom
- Cyanonitrene, molecular formula CN_{2}
- Cyanogen, molecular formula (CN)_{2}
