= Jacek M. Zurada =

Polish engineer

Jacek M. Żurada
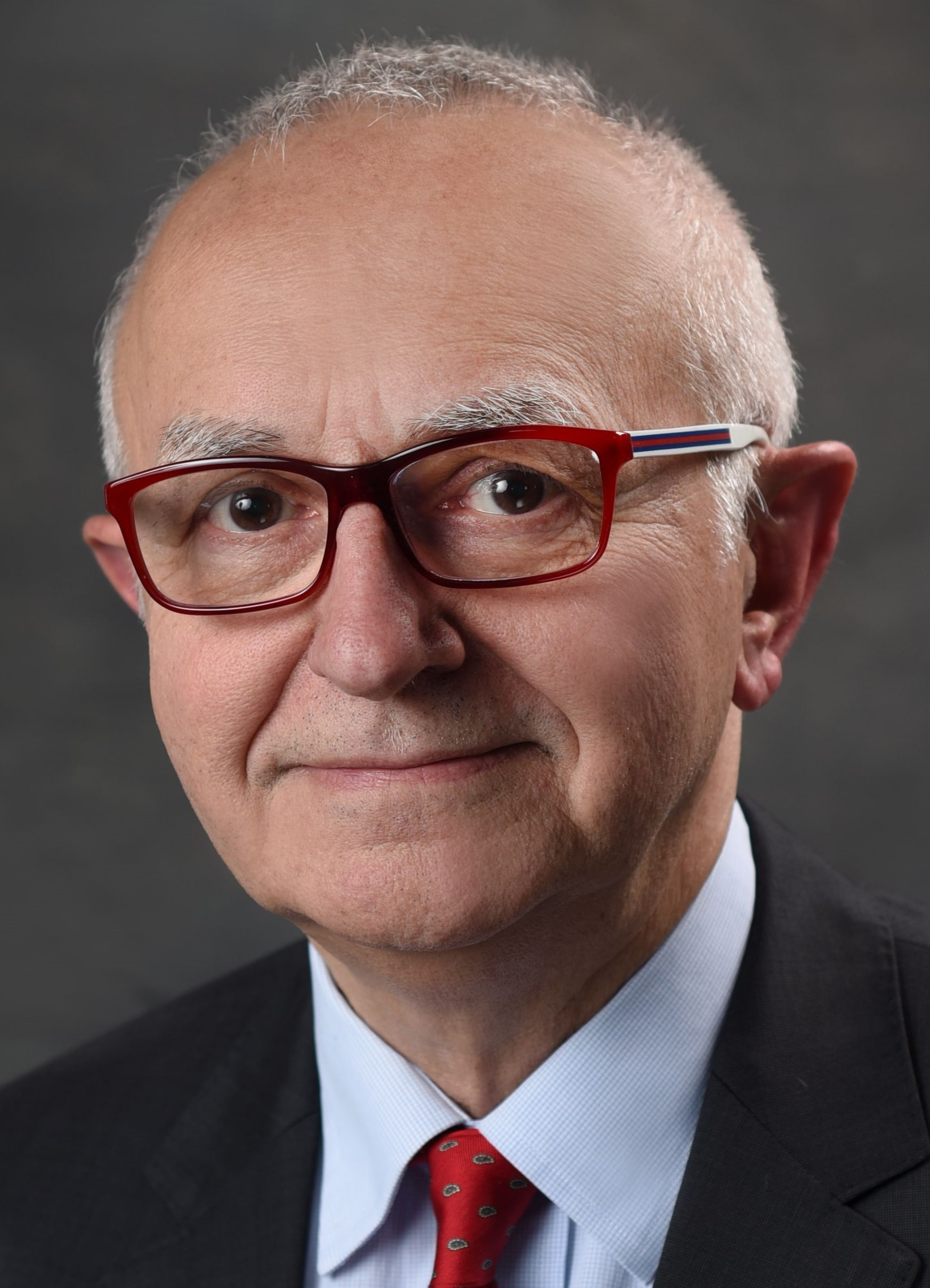
- Education: Gdańsk University of Technology (MS, PhD)
- Known for: Lambda learning rule for neural networks Decomposition methods for salient feature extraction
- Scientific career
- Fields: Neural networks, deep learning, data mining, machine learning, rule extraction
- Workplaces: University of Louisville; Swiss Federal Institute of Technology, Zurich; Princeton University; Northeastern University; Auburn University

Jacek M. Zurada is a Polish-American computer scientist who is a Professor of the Electrical and Computer Engineering Department at the University of Louisville, Kentucky. His M.S. and Ph.D. degrees are from Politechnika Gdaṅska (Gdansk University of Technology, Poland). He has held visiting appointments at the Swiss Federal Institute of Technology, Zurich, Princeton, Northeastern, and Auburn, and at overseas universities in Australia, Chile, China, France, Germany, Hong Kong, Italy, Japan, Poland, Singapore, Spain, and South Africa. He is a life fellow of IEEE and a fellow of the International Neural Networks Society and Doctor Honoris Causa of Czestochowa Institute of Technology, Poland.

== Research ==
Zurada's research covers neural networks, deep learning, data mining with emphasis on data and feature understanding, rule extraction from semantic and visual information, machine learning, decomposition methods for salient feature extraction, and lambda learning rule for neural networks.

== Professional and editorial service ==
Zurada was the editor-in-chief of IEEE Transactions on Neural Networks (1998–2003), an associate editor of IEEE Transactions on Circuits and Systems, Pt. I and Pt. II, Action Editor in Neural Networks (Elsevier) and on the editorial board of the Proceedings of the IEEE. He is an associate editor of Neurocomputing, Schedae Informaticae, the International Journal of Applied Mathematics and Computer Science, and Editor of the Springer Natural Computing, Advances in Intelligent Systems and Computing and Studies in Computational Intelligence Book series or volumes.

== Awards and honours ==
In 2003 he was given the title of Professor by the President of Poland. Since 2005 he has been an elected Foreign Member of the Polish Academy of Sciences. He also received five honorary professorships from foreign universities, including Sichuan University in Chengdu, China, and Obuda University in Budapest, Hungary.
