= Infobright =

Data analytics company in Warsaw

Infobright, Inc.
- Type: Private
- Industry: Enterprise software & Database management & Data warehousing
- Founded: 2005; 21 years ago
- Founder: Cas Apanowicz; Dominik Ślęzak; Piotr Synak; Jakub Wróblewski
- Headquarters: Warsaw, Poland
- Products: Infobright Enterprise Edition, (Discontinued) Infobright Community Edition (Discontinued) AQ Advanced Analytics Platform (AQ-AAP)
- Website: aqtechnologies.ai

Infobright is a software company based in Warsaw, Poland. It was founded in Canada as a commercial developer of column-oriented relational database software with a focus in machine-generated data. The company was later acquired in 2017 and then spun out in 2018 as an independent research and development organization today known as AQ Technologies based in Poland.

Its products are designed to solve complex big data analysis problems using artificial intelligence techniques to identify hidden data anomalies inside large amounts of data.

== History ==
Infobright was founded in 2005. It launched an open source version of its columnar database product in September 2008, while also at the same time launching its community site.

The company was spun out of technology developed by and within the Royal Bank of Canada (RBC) and funded by venture capital investors Flybridge Capital Partners and Information Venture Partners.

In 2009, Infobright was recognized as MySQL's Partner of the Year, and a Gartner Cool Vendor in Data Management and Integration. It is also certified for use with Sun's Unified Storage product line. It was the innovator and developer of multiple proprietary patents including data compression, query optimization, and data organization, a total of six distinct awarded patents.

In July 2016, Infobright officially transitioned away from its open source community edition to focus on their OEM and direct customer markets.

In 2017, Infobright and its assets, including intellectual property and source code, were acquired by Security On-Demand Inc. (SOD), a managed security services provider (MSSP) based in San Diego, California. The company invested in expanding the technology base to support cyber-security detection capabilities utilizing a new innovation in the analysis of large data sets using Approximate Query (AQ) techniques and Machine Learning.

In 2019, the SOD owners spun out the company to become an independent company becoming AQ Technologies S.P. Z.oo (AQT) headquartered in Warsaw Poland. The purpose of the newly organized company was to provide research and development technology and services for improved real-time analysis and detection of cyber-security threats within massive amounts of log data.

In late 2019, AQ Technologies, was awarded grant funding from National Centre for Research and Development (NCBR) by the government of Poland with the purpose of expanding Approximate Query analysis beyond structured numeric data the ability to analyze alpha-numeric and unstructured log data. In 2020, the company was awarded a second grant from the NCBR to further develop the capability to detect anomalies in unstructured data utilizing Artificial Intelligence techniques to enable cyber-security analysts to find "hidden" attackers within massive amounts of log data.

In late 2025, AQ Technologies was rolled up as a wholly owned subsidiary of Knowledge Grid, LLC, a startup company based in Salt Lake City, Utah, US. Its products are designed to turn high-volume security telemetry into AI-ready context for detection, correlation, and autonomous analysis.

== Technology ==
=== Infobright Enterprise Edition (IEE) ===
Infobright's database software is integrated with MySQL, but with its own proprietary data storage and query optimization layers.

Infobright uses a columnar approach to database design. When data is loaded into a table, it is broken into the groups of 2^{16} rows, further decomposed into separate data packs for each of the columns. By breaking each column by the same number of rows, it maintains its integrity with other columns for the same entry. For example, row 1, column 1 is the first entry in the first datapack for column 1. Row 1 in column 2 is the first entry in the first datapack for column 2.

Each data pack is separately compressed to approximately 20:1 on average. Infobright Enterprise Edition was designed to support PostgreSQL and MySQL.

==== Temporal Data Grid ====
A metadata layer (called the Temporal Data Grid) stores compact information about the contents and relationships between the data packs, replacing the concept of a traditional database index.

==== Query execution ====
The optimizer uses theories of rough sets and Granular Computing by categorizing which data packs need to be decompressed and by refining such categorization using partial results obtained from the Knowledge Grid and already decompressed data packs.
