= Rule induction =

Area of machine learning

Example of a decision tree

Rule induction is an area of machine learning in which formal rules are extracted from a set of observations. The rules extracted may represent a full scientific model of the data, or merely represent local patterns in the data.

Data mining in general and rule induction in detail are trying to create algorithms without human programming but with analyzing existing data structures. In the easiest case, a rule is expressed with “if-then statements” and was created with the ID3 algorithm for decision tree learning. Rule learning algorithm are taking training data as input and creating rules by partitioning the table with cluster analysis. A possible alternative over the ID3 algorithm is genetic programming which evolves a program until it fits to the data.

Creating different algorithm and testing them with input data can be realized in the WEKA software. Additional tools are machine learning libraries for Python, like scikit-learn.

== Paradigms ==
Some major rule induction paradigms are:

- Association rule learning algorithms (e.g., Agrawal)
- Decision rule algorithms (e.g., Quinlan 1987)
- Hypothesis testing algorithms (e.g., RULEX)
- Horn clause induction
- Version spaces
- Rough set rules
- Inductive Logic Programming
- Boolean decomposition (Feldman)

== Algorithms ==
Some rule induction algorithms are:

- Charade
- Rulex
- Progol
- CN2
