= Zdzisław Pawlak =

Polish mathematician and computer scientist

Zdzisław I. Pawlak
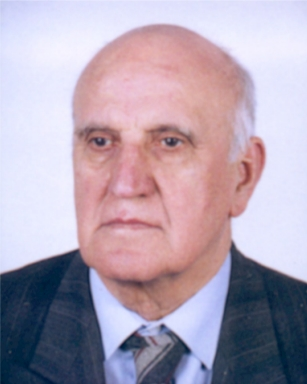
- Born: November 10, 1926; Łódź, Poland
- Died: April 7, 2006 (aged 79); Warsaw, Poland
- Education: Warsaw University of Technology; Polish Academy of Sciences
- Known for: Founder of rough set theory, Founder of Pawlak flow graphs
- Awards: Order of Polonia Restituta; Hugo Steinhaus Award
- Scientific career
- Fields: Computer science
- Workplaces: Polish Academy of Sciences; Warsaw University of Technology
- Doctoral advisor: Henryk Greniewski
- Doctoral students: Grzegorz Rozenberg

Zdzislaw I. Pawlak (10 November 1926 – 7 April 2006) was a Polish mathematician and computer scientist. He was affiliated with several organization, including the Polish Academy of Sciences and the Warsaw School of Information Technology. He served as the director of the Institute of Computer Science at the Warsaw University of Technology (1989–96). Pawlak was known for his contribution to many branches of theoretical computer science. He is credited with introducing the rough set theory and also known for his fundamental works on it. He also introduced the Pawlak flow graphs, a graphical framework for reasoning from data. He was conferred with Order of Polonia Restituta in 1999. He was also a full member of Polish Academy of Sciences.

== Education and career ==
Zdzislaw Pawlak was born on 10 November 1926 in Łódź, Poland. He graduated from a public elementary school in 1939. In 1946 he passed his Baccalaureate Diploma examination, and in 1947 he began studies at the Faculty of Electrical Engineering of the Łódź University of Technology. Two years later, he moved to the Faculty of Telecommunications at the Warsaw University of Technology. He received his M.Sc. degree in Telecommunications in 1951, after which he worked in the Institute of Mathematics of the Polish Academy of Sciences until 1957.
