= Game-theoretic rough sets =

Game-theoretic rough sets are the use of rough sets to induce three-way classification decisions. The positive, negative, and boundary regions can be interpreted as regions of acceptance, rejection, and deferment decisions, respectively. The probabilistic rough set model extends the conventional rough sets by providing a more effective way of classifying objects. A main result of probabilistic rough sets is the interpretation of three-way decisions using a pair of probabilistic thresholds. The game-theoretic rough set model determines and interprets the required thresholds by utilizing a game-theoretic environment for analyzing strategic situations between cooperative or conflicting decision-making criteria. The essential idea is to implement a game for investigating how the probabilistic thresholds may change in order to improve the rough set-based decision-making.
