= LTSA =

LTSA may refer to:

- Local tangent space alignment, a nonlinear dimensionality reduction method
- Land Title and Survey Authority in British Columbia, Canada
- Land Transport Safety Authority, a former government entity in New Zealand, preceding Land Transport New Zealand
- Latin Tropical/Salsa Airplay, a Billboard music chart
- Lyceum Tourism Students Association, of Lyceum of the Philippines University
- Labelled Transition System Analyser, a verification tool for concurrent computer systems
- Long Term Service Agreement, an agreement to provide service over a number of years
- Last Time Seen Alive
