= KPCA =

KPCA may refer to:

- KPCA-LP, a low-power radio station (103.3 FM) licensed to serve Petaluma, California, United States
- Kernel principal component analysis
