= Isometric =

The term isometric comes from the Greek for "having equal measurement".

isometric may mean:

- Cubic crystal system, also called isometric crystal system
- Isometre, a rhythmic technique in music.
- "Isometric (Intro)", a song by Madeon from the album Adventure
- Isometric exercise, a form of resistance exercise in which one's muscles are used in opposition with other muscle groups, to increase strength, for bodybuilding, physical fitness, or strength training.
- Isometric video game graphics, a near-isometric parallel projection used in computer art.
- Isometric joystick, a type of pointing stick, a computer input option
- Isometric platform game, a video game subgenre.
- Isometric process, a thermodynamic process at constant volume (also isovolumetric)
- Isometric projection (or "isometric perspective"), a method for drawing three-dimensional objects on flat paper so that a cubical grid is projected onto an equilateral triangle grid and distances aligned with the axes are depicted at uniform scale.
- Isometric scaling, in biology, when changes in size during growth or over evolutionary time do not lead to changes in proportion.
- Isometry and isometric embeddings in mathematics, a distance-preserving representation of one metric space as a subset of another. Like congruence in geometry.

== See also ==
- Isometry (disambiguation)
- Isometric video game (disambiguation)
