= Spectral submanifold =

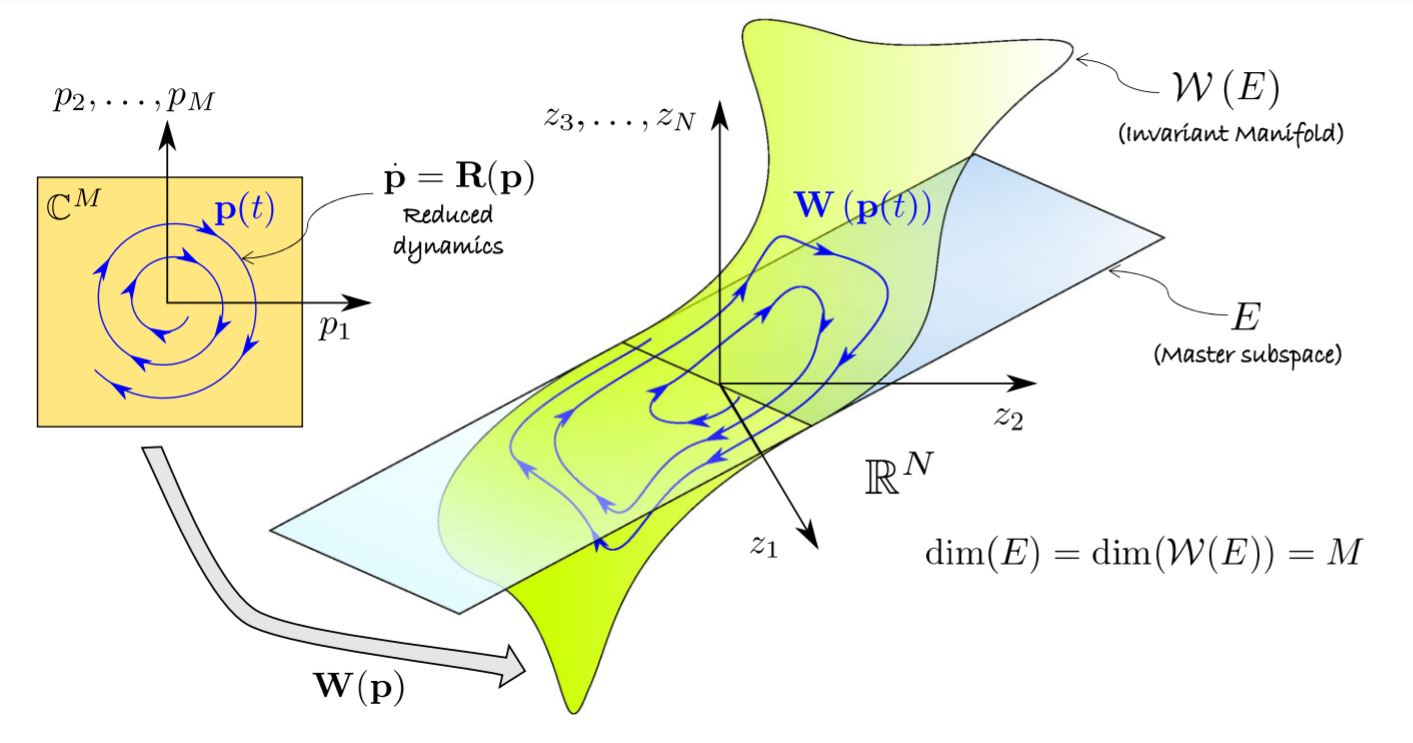
Schematic illustration of a spectral submanifold $\mathcal{W}(E)$ emanating from a spectral subspace $E$. A trajectory $p(t)$ in the reduced coordinates is mapped to the phase space via the manifold parametrization $W(p)$.

In dynamical systems, a spectral submanifold (SSM) is the unique smoothest invariant manifold serving as the nonlinear extension of a spectral subspace of a linear dynamical system under the addition of nonlinearities. SSM theory provides conditions for when invariant properties of eigenspaces of a linear dynamical system can be extended to a nonlinear system, and therefore motivates the use of SSMs in nonlinear dimensionality reduction.

SSMs are chiefly employed for the exact model reduction of dynamical systems. For the automated computation of SSMs and the analysis of the reduced dynamics, open source online software packages such as SSMTool and SSMLearn have been published. These tools allow to study system dynamics either from the underlying equations of motion or from trajectory data, supporting both analytical and data-driven approaches. Detailed documentation for SSMTool is provided online.

== Definition ==
Consider a nonlinear ordinary differential equation of the form

$$\frac{dx}{dt} = Ax + f_0(x),\quad x\in \R^n,$$

with constant matrix $\ A\in \R^{n\times n}$ and the nonlinearities contained in the smooth function $f_0 = \mathcal{O}(|x|^2)$.

Assume that $\text{Re} \lambda_j < 0$ for all eigenvalues $\lambda_j,\ j = 1,\ldots, n$ of $A$, that is, the origin is an asymptotically stable fixed point. Now select a span $E = \text{span}\, \{v^E_{1},\ldots v^E_{m}\}$ of $m$ eigenvectors $v^E_{i}$ of $A$. Then, the eigenspace $E$ is an invariant subspace of the linearized system

$$\frac{dx}{dt} = Ax,\quad x\in \R^n.$$

Under addition of the nonlinearity $f_0$ to the linear system, $E$ generally perturbs into infinitely many invariant manifolds. Among these invariant manifolds, the unique smoothest one is referred to as the spectral submanifold.

An equivalent result for unstable SSMs holds for $\text{Re} \lambda_j > 0$.

=== Existence ===
The spectral submanifold tangent to $E$ at the origin is guaranteed to exist provided that certain non-resonance conditions are satisfied by the eigenvalues $\lambda^E_i$ in the spectrum of $E$. In particular, there can be no linear combination of $\lambda^E_i$ equal to one of the eigenvalues of $A$ outside of the spectral subspace. If there is such an outer resonance, one can include the resonant mode into $E$ and extend the analysis to a higher-dimensional SSM pertaining to the extended spectral subspace.

== Non-autonomous extension ==
The theory on spectral submanifolds extends to nonlinear non-autonomous systems of the form

$$\frac{dx}{dt} = Ax + f_0(x) + \epsilon f_1(x, \Omega t),\quad \Omega\in \mathbb{T}^k,\ 0\le \epsilon \ll 1,$$

with $f_1 : \R^n \times \mathbb{T}^k \to \R^n$ a quasiperiodic forcing term.

== Significance ==
Spectral submanifolds are useful for rigorous nonlinear dimensionality reduction in dynamical systems. The reduction of a high-dimensional phase space to a lower-dimensional manifold can lead to major simplifications by allowing for an accurate description of the system's main asymptotic behaviour. For a known dynamical system, SSMs can be computed analytically by solving the invariance equations, and reduced models on SSMs may be employed for prediction of the response to forcing.

Furthermore these manifolds may also be extracted directly from trajectory data of a dynamical system with the use of machine learning algorithms.

== See also ==
- Invariant manifold
- Nonlinear dimensionality reduction
- Lagrangian coherent structure
