= Global cascades model =

Global cascades models are a class of models aiming to model large and rare cascades that are triggered by exogenous perturbations which are relatively small compared with the size of the system. The phenomenon occurs ubiquitously in various systems, like information cascades in social systems, stock market crashes in economic systems, and cascading failure in physics infrastructure networks. The models capture some essential properties of such phenomenon.

== Model description ==
To describe and understand global cascades, a network-based threshold model has been proposed by Duncan J. Watts in 2002. The model is motivated by considering a population of individuals who must make a decision between two alternatives, and their choices depend explicitly on other people's states or choices. The model assumes that an individual will adopt a new particular opinion (product or state) if a threshold fraction of his/her neighbors have adopted the new one, else he would keep his original state. To initiate the model, a new opinion will be randomly distributed among a small fraction of individuals in the network. If the fraction satisfies a particular condition, a large cascade can be triggered.(see Global Cascades Condition) A phase transition phenomenon has been observed: when the network of interpersonal influences is sparse, the size of the cascades exhibits a power law distribution, the most highly connected nodes are critical in triggering cascades, and if the network is relatively dense, the distribution shows a bimodal form, in which nodes with average degree show more importance by serving as triggers.

Several generalizations of the Watt's threshold model have been proposed and analyzed in the following years. For example, the original model has been combined with independent interaction models to provide a generalized model of social contagion, which classifies the behavior of the system into three universal classes. It has also been generalized on modular networks degree-correlated networks and to networks with tunable clustering. The role of the initiators has also been studied recently, shows that different initiator would influence the size of the cascades. Watt's threshold model is one of the few models that shows qualitative differences on multiplex networks and single layer networks. It can furthermore exhibit broad and multi-modal cascade size distributions on finite networks.

== Global cascades condition ==
To derive the precise cascade condition in the original model, a generating function method could be applied. The generating function for vulnerable nodes in the network is:

$$G_0(x)= \sum_k \rho_k p_k x^k,$$

where p_{k} is the probability a node has degree k, and

$$\rho_k =
\begin{cases}
1  & k=0 \\
\int_0^{1/k}f(\chi) \, d\chi & k>0 \\
\end{cases}$$

and f is the distribution of the threshold fraction of individuals. The average vulnerable cluster size can be derived as:

$$\langle n\rangle=G_0(1)+\frac{G_0'(1)^2}{z-G_0''(1)}$$

where z is the average degree of the network. The Global cascades occur when the average vulnerable cluster size ⟨n⟩ diverges

$$G_0''(1)=\sum_k k(k-1) \rho_k p_k = z$$

The equation could be interpreted as: When $G_0''(1)<z$, the clusters in the network is small and global cascades will not happen since the early adopters are isolated in the system, thus no enough momentum could be generated. When $G_0''(1)>z$, the typical size of the vulnerable cluster is infinite, which implies presence of global cascades.

== Relations with other contagion models ==
The Model considers a change of state of individuals in different systems which belongs to a larger class of contagion problems. However it differs with other models in several aspects: Compared with 1) epidemic model: where contagion events between individual pairs are independent, the effect a single infected node having on an individual depends on the individual's other neighbors in the proposed model. Unlike 2) percolation or self-organized criticality models, the threshold is not expressed as the absolute number of "infected" neighbors around an individual, instead, a corresponding fraction of neighbors is selected. It is also different from 3) random-field ising model and majority voter model, which are frequently analyzed on regular lattices, here, however the heterogeneity of the network plays a significant role.

== See also ==
- Threshold model
- Information cascade
- Stock market crash
- Cascading failure
- Epidemic model
- Percolation_theory
- Self-organized criticality
- Ising model
- Voter model
- Complex contagion
- Sociological theory of diffusion
- Global cascade
