= Isometry (disambiguation) =

Isometry, in mathematics, refers to a distance-preserving transformation. Isometry may also refer to:

- Isometry between quadratic spaces
- Isometry group
- Quasi-isometry
- Dade isometry
- Euclidean isometry
- Euclidean plane isometry
- Itō isometry

== See also ==
- Isometric (disambiguation)
- Isometries in physics
