= Stress majorization =

Geometric placement based on ideal distances

Stress majorization is an optimization strategy used in multidimensional scaling (MDS) where, for a set of $n$ $m$-dimensional data items, a configuration $X$ of $n$ points in $r$ $(\ll m)$-dimensional space is sought that minimizes the so-called stress function $\sigma(X)$. Usually $r$ is $2$ or $3$, i.e. the $(n\times r)$ matrix $X$ lists points in $2-$ or $3-$dimensional Euclidean space so that the result may be visualised (i.e. an MDS plot). The function $\sigma$ is a cost or loss function that measures the squared differences between ideal ($m$-dimensional) distances and actual distances in r-dimensional space. It is defined as:

$$\sigma(X)=\sum_{i<j\le n}w_{ij}(d_{ij}(X)-\delta_{ij})^2$$

where $w_{ij}\ge 0$ is a weight for the measurement between a pair of points $(i,j)$, $d_{ij}(X)$ is the euclidean distance between $i$ and $j$ and $\delta_{ij}$ is the ideal distance between the points (their separation) in the $m$-dimensional data space. Note that $w_{ij}$ can be used to specify a degree of confidence in the similarity between points (e.g. 0 can be specified if there is no information for a particular pair).

A configuration $X$ which minimizes $\sigma(X)$ gives a plot in which points that are close together correspond to points that are also close together in the original $m$-dimensional data space.

There are many ways that $\sigma(X)$ could be minimized. For example, Kruskal recommended an iterative steepest descent approach. However, a significantly better (in terms of guarantees on, and rate of, convergence) method for minimizing stress was introduced by Jan de Leeuw. De Leeuw's iterative majorization method at each step minimizes a simple convex function which both bounds $\sigma$ from above and touches the surface of $\sigma$ at a point $Z$, called the supporting point. In convex analysis such a function is called a majorizing function. This iterative majorization process is also referred to as the SMACOF algorithm ("Scaling by MAjorizing a COmplicated Function").

== The SMACOF algorithm ==
The stress function $\sigma$ can be expanded as follows:

$$\sigma(X)=\sum_{i<j\le n}w_{ij}(d_{ij}(X)-\delta_{ij})^2
=\sum_{i<j}w_{ij}\delta_{ij}^2 + \sum_{i<j}w_{ij}d_{ij}^2(X)-2\sum_{i<j}w_{ij}\delta_{ij}d_{ij}(X)$$

Note that the first term is a constant $C$ and the second term is quadratic in $X$ (i.e. for the Hessian matrix $V$ the second term is equivalent to tr$X'VX$) and therefore relatively easily solved. The third term is bounded by:

$$\sum_{i<j}w_{ij}\delta_{ij}d_{ij}(X)=\,\operatorname{tr}\, X'B(X)X \ge \,\operatorname{tr}\, X'B(Z)Z$$

where $B(Z)$ has:

$b_{ij}=-\frac{w_{ij}\delta_{ij}}{d_{ij}(Z)}$ for $d_{ij}(Z)\ne 0, i \ne j$

and $b_{ij}=0$ for $d_{ij}(Z)=0, i\ne j$

and $b_{ii}=-\sum_{j=1,j\ne i}^n b_{ij}$.

Proof of this inequality is by the Cauchy-Schwarz inequality, see Borg (pp. 152–153).

Thus, we have a simple quadratic function $\tau(X,Z)$ that majorizes stress:

$$\sigma(X)=C+\,\operatorname{tr}\, X'VX - 2 \,\operatorname{tr}\, X'B(X)X$$
$$\le C+\,\operatorname{tr}\, X' V X - 2 \,\operatorname{tr}\, X'B(Z)Z = \tau(X,Z)$$

The iterative minimization procedure is then:

- at the $k^{th}$ step we set $Z\leftarrow X^{k-1}$
- $X^k\leftarrow \min_X \tau(X,Z)$
- stop if $\sigma(X^{k-1})-\sigma(X^{k})<\epsilon$ otherwise repeat.

This algorithm has been shown to decrease stress monotonically (see de Leeuw).

== Use in graph drawing ==
Stress majorization and algorithms similar to SMACOF also have application in the field of graph drawing. That is, one can find a reasonably aesthetically appealing layout for a network or graph by minimizing a stress function over the positions of the nodes in the graph. In this case, the $\delta_{ij}$ are usually set to the graph-theoretic distances between nodes $i$ and $j$ and the weights $w_{ij}$ are taken to be $\delta_{ij}^{-\alpha}$. Here, $\alpha$ is chosen as a trade-off between preserving long- or short-range ideal distances. Good results have been shown for $\alpha=2$.
