= Isometric video game =

Isometric video game or isometric game may refer to:

- Isometric video game graphics, a style in video games, with the playfield viewed at an angle instead of flat from the side or top; perspective is used to give a 3D effect; also known as "3/4 perspective", "2.5D", and "pseudo-3D"
  - Isometric platform game, a genre using this style of graphics
  - Isometric role-playing game, a genre using this style of graphics
- Isometric gameplay, the incremental raising of a wide variety of character stats to remain competitive; a feature of role-playing games (video or otherwise) and related genres. Depending on game design, it may involve any combination of:
  - Dynamic game difficulty balancing, automatically changing parameters, scenarios, and AI behaviors in a game in real-time, based on player stats, and the player response to this
  - Grinding (gaming), performing repetitive, often tedious, tasks for gameplay advantage
  - Micromanagement (gameplay), in-depth handling of detailed gameplay elements by the player for strategic or tactical purposes
  - Min-maxing, creating the best character the player can, by minimizing undesired or unimportant traits and maximizing desired ones
