= List of artificial intelligence algorithms =

This is a list of artificial intelligence algorithms, including algorithms and algorithmic methods used in artificial intelligence (AI) for search, automated reasoning, knowledge representation and reasoning, planning, machine learning, deep learning, natural language processing, computer vision, and related areas.

== Search ==
=== Search algorithms ===
- A* search algorithm
- Beam search
- Beam stack search
- Best-first search
- Breadth-first search
- Depth-first search
- General Problem Solver
- Iterative deepening A*
- Iterative deepening depth-first search
- Uniform-cost search

=== Game-tree search ===
- Alpha–beta pruning
- Expectiminimax
- Minimax
- Monte Carlo tree search
- SSS*

== Optimization ==
- ALOPEX
- Bayesian optimization
- Conjugate gradient method
- Gradient descent
- Hill climbing
- Levenberg–Marquardt algorithm
- Quadratic unconstrained binary optimization
- Quasi-Newton method
- Simulated annealing
- Stochastic gradient descent

== Evolutionary and bio-inspired methods ==
=== Evolutionary computation ===
- Differential evolution
- Evolutionary multimodal optimization
- Genetic algorithm
- Genetic programming

=== Bio-inspired methods ===
- Ant colony optimization algorithms
- Particle swarm optimization

== Reasoning and inference ==
=== Automated reasoning ===
- Backward chaining
- Forward chaining
- Rete algorithm

=== Logic ===
- DPLL algorithm
- Resolution (logic)
- WalkSAT

=== Statistical inference ===
- Baum–Welch algorithm
- Belief propagation
- Expectation–maximization algorithm
- Forward–backward algorithm
- Kalman filter
- Markov chain Monte Carlo (MCMC)
- Viterbi algorithm

== Planning and navigation ==
=== Pathfinding ===
- A*
- D*
- Dijkstra's algorithm
- Theta*

=== Motion planning ===
- Bug algorithm
- Dynamic window approach
- Graphplan
- Probabilistic roadmap
- Rapidly-exploring random tree
- Vector Field Histogram

== Machine learning ==
=== Ensemble learning ===
- AdaBoost
- Bootstrap aggregating
- BrownBoost
- Gradient boosting
- LogitBoost
- LPBoost
- Random forest
- Randomized weighted majority algorithm
- Weighted majority algorithm

=== Classification ===
- Alternating decision tree
- C4.5 algorithm
- CN2 algorithm
- Decision tree learning
- Dominance-based rough set approach
- Genetic Algorithm for Rule Set Production
- ID3 algorithm
- k-nearest neighbors algorithm
- Logic learning machine
- Logistic regression
- Naive Bayes classifier
- Relevance vector machine
- RIPPER
- Structured kNN
- Support vector machine
- Winnow algorithm

=== Clustering ===
- DBSCAN
- Hierarchical clustering
- k-means++
- k-means clustering
- k-medoids
- Linde–Buzo–Gray algorithm
- Lloyd's algorithm
- OPTICS

=== Association learning ===
- Apriori algorithm
- Eclat algorithm
- FP-growth algorithm

=== Dimensionality reduction ===
- Diffusion map
- FastICA
- Kernel principal component analysis
- Manifold alignment
- Minimum redundancy feature selection
- Non-negative matrix factorization
- Principal component analysis
- Sparse PCA
- T-distributed stochastic neighbor embedding

=== Neural learning ===
- Almeida–Pineda recurrent backpropagation
- Backpropagation
- GeneRec
- Generalized Hebbian algorithm
- Growing self-organizing map
- Leabra
- Learning vector quantization
- Perceptron
- Quickprop
- Rprop
- Self-organizing map
- Wake-sleep algorithm

=== Reinforcement learning ===
- Actor-critic algorithm
- Constructing skill trees
- Error-driven learning
- Policy gradient method
- Prefrontal cortex basal ganglia working memory
- Proximal policy optimization
- PVLV
- Q-learning
- Skill chaining
- State–action–reward–state–action
- Temporal difference learning

=== Deep learning ===
- PagedAttention
- vAttention

=== Other machine learning ===
- Dynamic time warping
- IDistance
- Local outlier factor

== Natural language processing ==
- Byte-pair encoding
- Cocke–Younger–Kasami algorithm
- Earley parser
- Inside-outside algorithm

== Computer vision ==
- Canny edge detector
- GrabCut
- RANSAC
- Scale-invariant feature transform

== Algorithmic game play ==
- AlphaGo
- AlphaGo Zero
- AlphaZero
- MuZero
- TD-Gammon

== See also ==
- Algorithm engineering
- Glossary of artificial intelligence
- List of algorithms
- List of artificial intelligence journals
- List of quantum algorithms
- List of robotics software
- Outline of algorithms
- Outline of artificial intelligence
- Lists of open-source artificial intelligence software
- TurboQuant – online vector quantization algorithm for compressing high-dimensional vectors in large language model inference
- AlphaDev, AlphaEvolve, AlphaTensor — AI systems by Google DeepMind for discovering and optimizing algorithms
