= GeneRec =

Algorithm

GeneRec is a generalization of the recirculation algorithm, and approximates Almeida–Pineda recurrent backpropagation. It is used as part of the Leabra algorithm for error-driven learning.

The symmetric, midpoint version of GeneRec is equivalent to the contrastive Hebbian learning algorithm (CHL).

== See also ==
- Leabra
- O'Reilly (1996; Neural Computation)
