= Topias =

Topias may refer to:

- Thopia family, medieval Albanian noble house
- Topias Leinonen (born 2004), Finnish hockey player
- Topias Palmi (born 1994), Finnish basketball player
- Topias Taavitsainen (born 1998), better known as Topson, Finnish professional Dota 2 player
- Topias Vilén (born 2003), Finnish hockey player

== See also ==
- Toivo Topias Pohjala (1931–2018), Finnish agronomist and politician
- Ville Topias Pulkki (born 1969), Finnish acoustics researcher
