= Hybrid Kohonen self-organizing map =

In artificial neural networks, a hybrid Kohonen self-organizing map is a type of self-organizing map (SOM) named for the Finnish professor Teuvo Kohonen, where the network architecture consists of an input layer fully connected to a 2–D SOM or Kohonen layer.

The output from the Kohonen layer, which is the winning neuron, feeds into a hidden layer and finally into an output layer. In other words, the Kohonen SOM is the front–end, while the hidden and output layer of a multilayer perceptron is the back–end of the hybrid Kohonen SOM. The hybrid Kohonen SOM was first applied to machine vision systems for image classification and recognition.

Hybrid Kohonen SOM has been used in weather prediction and especially in forecasting stock prices, which has made a challenging task considerably easier. It is fast and efficient with less classification error, hence is a better predictor, when compared to Kohonen SOM and backpropagation networks.
