= Prototype methods =

Method of machine learning

Prototype methods are machine learning methods that use data prototypes. A data prototype is a data value that reflects other values in its class, e.g., the centroid in a K-means clustering problem.

== Methods ==
The following are some prototype methods

- K-means clustering
- Learning vector quantization (LVQ)
- Gaussian mixtures

== Related Methods ==
While K-nearest neighbor's does not use prototypes, it is similar to prototype methods like K-means clustering.
