= Randall C. O'Reilly =

American computational psychologist

- Born: March 1, 1967 (age 59); Denver, Colorado
- Education: Carnegie Mellon University
- Known for: Leabra
- Scientific career
- Fields: Psychology
- Workplaces: University of Colorado at Boulder
- Thesis: The LEABRA model of neural interactions and learning in the neocortex (1996)
- Doctoral advisor: James McClelland

Randall Charles O'Reilly (born March 1, 1967) is a professor of psychology and computer science at the Center for Neuroscience at the University of California, Davis. His lab moved to UC Davis from the University of Colorado at Boulder in 2019. He now works full time at the Astera Institute.

== Education ==
Randall O'Reilly obtained his B.A. at Harvard University and his M.S. at Carnegie Mellon University. He went on to get a Ph.D. in Psychology also at Carnegie Mellon University in 1996, under the supervision of James McClelland. He did postdoctoral work at Massachusetts Institute of Technology in the Brain and Cognitive Sciences department.

== Research ==
O'Reilly's research is aimed at developing detailed computational models of the biological basis of cognition. He is most famous for developing of the Leabra recirculating algorithm for learning in neural networks. He has developed a number of successful models of declarative memory, the visual system, and the basal ganglia circuit.

He is one of the main developers of the Emergent neural network simulation software.
