= Oja's rule =

Model of how neurons in the brain or artificial neural networks learn over time

Oja's learning rule, or simply Oja's rule, named after Finnish computer scientist Erkki Oja (Finnish pronunciation: [ˈojɑ], AW-yuh), is a model of how neurons in the brain or in artificial neural networks change connection strength, or learn, over time. It is a modification of the standard Hebb's Rule that, through multiplicative normalization, solves all stability problems and generates an algorithm for principal components analysis. This is a computational form of an effect which is believed to happen in biological neurons.

== Theory ==
Oja's rule requires a number of simplifications to derive, but in its final form it is demonstrably stable, unlike Hebb's rule. It is a single-neuron special case of the Generalized Hebbian Algorithm. However, Oja's rule can also be generalized in other ways to varying degrees of stability and success.

=== Formula ===
Consider a simplified model of a neuron $y$ that returns a linear combination of its inputs x using presynaptic weights w:

$\,y(\mathbf{x}) ~ = ~ \sum_{j=1}^m x_j w_j$

Oja's rule defines the change in presynaptic weights w given the output response $y$ of a neuron to its inputs x to be

$$\,\Delta \mathbf{w} ~ = ~ \mathbf{w}_{n+1}-\mathbf{w}_{n} ~ = ~ \eta \, y_{n} (\mathbf{x}_{n} - y_{n}\mathbf{w}_{n}),$$

where η is the learning rate which can also change with time. Note that the bold symbols are vectors and n defines a discrete time iteration. The rule can also be made for continuous iterations as

$$\,\frac{d\mathbf{w}}{d t} ~ = ~ \eta \, y(t) (\mathbf{x}(t) - y(t)\mathbf{w}(t)).$$

=== Derivation ===
The simplest learning rule known is Hebb's rule, which states in conceptual terms that neurons that fire together, wire together. In component form as a difference equation, it is written

$$\,\Delta\mathbf{w} ~ = ~ \eta\, y(\mathbf{x}_n) \mathbf{x}_{n}$$,

or in scalar form with implicit n-dependence,

$$\,w_{i}(n+1) ~ = ~ w_{i}(n) + \eta\, y(\mathbf{x}) x_{i}$$,

where y(x_{n}) is again the output, this time explicitly dependent on its input vector x.

Hebb's rule has synaptic weights approaching infinity with a positive learning rate. We can stop this by normalizing the weights so that each weight's magnitude is restricted between 0, corresponding to no weight, and 1, corresponding to being the only input neuron with any weight. We do this by normalizing the weight vector to be of length one:

$$\,w_i (n+1) ~ = ~ \frac{w_i(n) + \eta\, y(\mathbf{x}) x_i}{\left(\sum_{j=1}^m [w_j(n) + \eta\, y(\mathbf{x}) x_j]^p \right)^{1/p}}$$.

Note that in Oja's original paper, p=2, corresponding to quadrature (root sum of squares), which is the familiar Cartesian normalization rule. However, any type of normalization, even linear, will give the same result without loss of generality.

For a small learning rate $| \eta | \ll 1$ the equation can be expanded as a Power series in $\eta$.

$$\,w_i (n+1) ~ = ~ \frac{w_i(n)}{\left( \sum_j w_j^p(n) \right)^{1/p}} ~ + ~ \eta \left( \frac{y x_i}{\left(\sum_j w_j^p(n) \right)^{1/p}} - \frac{w_i(n) \sum_j y x_j w_j^{p-1}(n)}{\left(\sum_j w_j^p(n) \right)^{(1 + 1/p)}} \right) ~ + ~ O(\eta^2)$$.

For small η, our higher-order terms O(η^{2}) go to zero. We again make the specification of a linear neuron, that is, the output of the neuron is equal to the sum of the product of each input and its synaptic weight to the power of p-1, which in the case of p=2 is synaptic weight itself, or

$$\,y(\mathbf{x}) ~ = ~ \sum_{j=1}^m x_j w_j^{p-1}$$.

We also specify that our weights normalize to 1, which will be a necessary condition for stability, so

$$\,| \mathbf{w} | ~ = ~ \left( \sum_{j=1}^m w_j^p \right)^{1/p} ~ = ~ 1$$,

which, when substituted into our expansion, gives Oja's rule, or

$$\,w_i (n+1) ~ = ~ w_i(n) + \eta\, y(x_i - w_i(n) y)$$.

=== Stability and PCA ===
In analyzing the convergence of a single neuron evolving by Oja's rule, one extracts the first principal component, or feature, of a data set. Furthermore, with extensions using the Generalized Hebbian Algorithm, one can create a multi-Oja neural network that can extract as many features as desired, allowing for principal components analysis.

A principal component a_{j} is extracted from a dataset x through some associated vector q_{j}, or a_{j} = q_{j}⋅x, and we can restore our original dataset by taking

$$\mathbf{x} ~ = ~ \sum_j a_j \mathbf{q}_j$$.

In the case of a single neuron trained by Oja's rule, we find the weight vector converges to q_{1}, or the first principal component, as time or number of iterations approaches infinity. We can also define, given a set of input vectors X_{i}, that its correlation matrix R_{ij} = X_{i}X_{j} has an associated eigenvector given by q_{j} with eigenvalue λ_{j}. The variance of outputs of our Oja neuron σ^{2}(n) = ⟨y^{2}(n)⟩ then converges with time iterations to the principal eigenvalue, or

$$\lim_{n\rightarrow\infty} \sigma^2(n) ~ = ~ \lambda_1$$.

These results are derived using Lyapunov function analysis, and they show that Oja's neuron necessarily converges on strictly the first principal component if certain conditions are met in our original learning rule. Most importantly, our learning rate η is allowed to vary with time, but only such that its sum is divergent but its power sum is convergent, that is

$$\sum_{n=1}^\infty \eta(n) = \infty, ~~~ \sum_{n=1}^\infty \eta(n)^p < \infty, ~~~ p > 1$$.

Our output activation function y(x(n)) is also allowed to be nonlinear and nonstatic, but it must be continuously differentiable in both x and w and have derivatives bounded in time.

== Applications ==
Oja's rule was originally described in Oja's 1982 paper, but the principle of self-organization to which it is applied is first attributed to Alan Turing in 1952. PCA has also had a long history of use before Oja's rule formalized its use in network computation in 1989. The model can thus be applied to any problem of self-organizing mapping, in particular those in which feature extraction is of primary interest. Therefore, Oja's rule has an important place in image and speech processing. It is also useful as it expands easily to higher dimensions of processing, thus being able to integrate multiple outputs quickly. A canonical example is its use in binocular vision.

=== Biology and Oja's subspace rule ===
There is clear evidence for both long-term potentiation and long-term depression in biological neural networks, along with a normalization effect in both input weights and neuron outputs. However, while there is no direct experimental evidence yet of Oja's rule active in a biological neural network, a biophysical derivation of a generalization of the rule is possible. Such a derivation requires retrograde signalling from the postsynaptic neuron, which is biologically plausible (see neural backpropagation), and takes the form of

$$\Delta w_{ij} ~ \propto ~ \langle x_i y_j \rangle - \epsilon \left\langle \left(c_\mathrm{pre} * \sum_k w_{ik} y_k \right) \cdot \left(c_\mathrm{post} * y_j \right) \right\rangle,$$

where as before w_{ij} is the synaptic weight between the ith input and jth output neurons, x is the input, y is the postsynaptic output, and we define ε to be a constant analogous the learning rate, and c_{pre} and c_{post} are presynaptic and postsynaptic functions that model the weakening of signals over time. Note that the angle brackets denote the average and the ∗ operator is a convolution. By taking the pre- and post-synaptic functions into frequency space and combining integration terms with the convolution, we find that this gives an arbitrary-dimensional generalization of Oja's rule known as Oja's Subspace, namely

$\Delta w ~ = ~ C x\cdot w - w\cdot C y.$

== See also ==
- BCM theory
- Contrastive Hebbian learning
- Generalized Hebbian algorithm
- Independent components analysis
- Principal component analysis
- Self-organizing map
- Synaptic plasticity
