= Věra Kůrková =

Czech mathematician and computer scientist

Věra Kůrková (born 1948) is a Czech mathematician and computer scientist, affiliated with the Institute of Computer Science of the Czech Academy of Sciences. Her research interests include neural networks, computational learning theory, and nonlinear approximation theory. She formulated the abstract concept of a variational norm in 1997 which puts ideas of Maurey, Jones, and Barron into the context of functional analysis. See V. Kůrková, Dimension-independent rates of approximation by neural networks. In: Warwick, K., Karny, M. (eds.) Computer-Intensive Methods in Control and Signal Processing. The Curse of Dimensionality, Birkhauser, Boston, MA, pp. 261–270 (1997). See also F. Girosi and G. Anzellotti, Convergence rates of approximation by translates, MIT Artificial Intelligence Laboratory, AI Memo No. 1288, April 1995, C.B.I.P. Paper No. 73. Kůrková is also known for the concept of quasiorthogonal set which she developed jointly with Robert Hecht-Nielsen and Paul Kainen.

Kůrková earned a Ph.D. in 1980 and a habilitation in 1999, both from Charles University. She has been affiliated with the Czech Academy of Sciences since 1990, and she headed the Department of Theoretical Computer Science within the Institute of Computer Science from 2002 to 2008.

In 2010, the Czech Academy of Sciences awarded Kůrková the Bernard Bolzano Honorary Medal for Merit in the Mathematical Sciences. From 2017 to 2019, Kůrková was president of the European Neural Network Society. For recent work, see V. Kůrková, M. Sanguineti, Classification by sparse neural networks, IEEE Trans Neural Netw Learn Syst. 2019 Jan 10. doi: 10.1109/TNNLS.2018.2888517 [Epub ahead of print] and two chapters in the forthcoming Vladik Kreinovich Festschrift volume published by Springer.
