= Vesa Välimäki =

- Born: 12 May 1968 (age 58); Kuorevesi, Finland
- Education: Helsinki University of Technology
- Known for: Fractional Delay Filters
- Awards: IEEE Fellow, AES Fellow
- Scientific career
- Fields: Synthesis and processing of audio signals
- Workplaces: Helsinki University of Technology; Aalto University
- Thesis: Discrete-Time Modeling of Acoustic Tubes Using Fractional Delay Filters (1995)
- Doctoral advisor: Matti Karjalainen

Vesa Pekka Välimäki (born 12 May 1968, Kuorevesi) is a Finnish acoustics researcher and a professor at Aalto University. He was appointed a docent in audio signal processing at Helsinki University of Technology in 1999–2002 and a full professor in 2002.

== Education ==
Välimäki studied at the Helsinki University of Technology, where he obtained a Master of Science in Technology in 1992, a Licentiate of Science in Technology in 1994, and a Doctor of Science in Technology in 1995.

== Thesis ==
- Discrete-Time Modeling of Acoustic Tubes Using Fractional Delay Filters. Report / Faculty of Electrical Engineering, Laboratory of Acoustics and Audio Signal Processing, 37. Espoo: Helsinki University of Technology. 1995. ISBN 951-22-2880-7. ISSN 0788-4559.

== Awards and honors ==
- a Fellow of the Institute of Electrical and Electronics Engineers (IEEE Signal Processing Society) (2014)
- a Fellow of the Audio Engineering Society (2012)
- a Life Member of the Acoustical Society of Finland (2014)
