= Ville Topias Pulkki =

Finnish researcher and professor

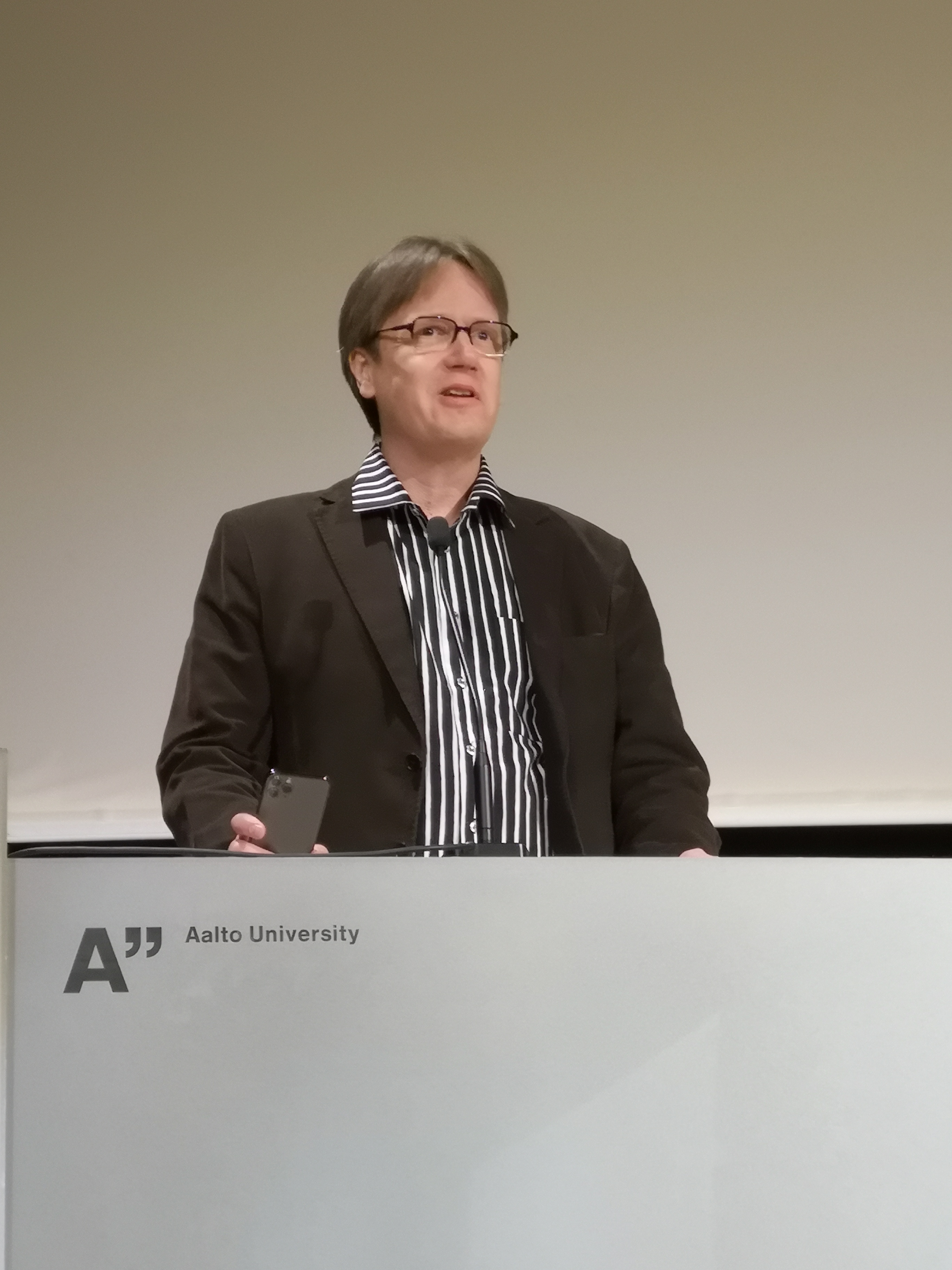
- Prof. Ville Pulkki speaking at Aalto University in 2023.
- Born: May 10, 1969 (age 57); Jyväskylä, Finland
- Education: Helsinki University of Technology
- Known for: Spatial sound
- Awards: AES Fellow (2010), Samuel L. Warner Memorial Medal (2014), AES Silver Medal (2017)
- Scientific career
- Fields: Spatial sound, Psychoacoustics
- Workplaces: Aalto University
- Thesis: Spatial Sound Generation and Perception by Amplitude Panning Techniques (2001)
- Doctoral advisor: Matti Karjalainen

Ville Topias Pulkki (born May 10, 1969) is a Finnish acoustics researcher and professor at Aalto University 2015–.

== Education ==
Pulkki studied at the Helsinki University of Technology (TKK), now Aalto University. He obtained a Master of Science in Technology in 1994 studying in the Dept. of Physics under the supervision of Prof. Teuvo Kohonen, best known for inventing the Kohonen Self-Organizing Map. He obtained and a Doctor of Science in Technology in 2001, from the Acoustics Laboratory of TKK under the supervision of Prof. Matti Karjalainen.

== Career ==
During the period of his Master's degree at TKK, Pulkki was also studying for a music Master’s degree at the Sibelius Academy, where he undertook technical duties, assisting with a system for panning signals to the multiple loudspeakers of the Chamber music hall. After unsuccessful attempts to apply a pair-wise panning approach based on the sine/tangent principles he adopted a vector-based approach, leading to the development of Vector Base Amplitude Panning method which was formalized during his Doctoral thesis research (1994-2001). Initially, open-access VBAP implementations were provided for C language, Max/MSP, CSound and PureData platforms (http://legacy.spa.aalto.fi/software/vbap/) and a have attracted significant interest within the audio research and academic community. The VBAP method was subsequently adopted by many widely used 3D multi-channel formats, systems and platforms (e.g. the ISO MPEG-H standard / DTS / Sony Playstation VR / 3GPP IVAS). After completing his PhD in 2001, Pulkki and his co-workers at the Acoustics Laboratory developed the DirAC method for spatial audio coding and synthesis.

Pulkki was appointed docent of spatial sound at Aalto University in 2007–2012, an assistant professor in 2012–2015 and a professor in 2015.

Pulkki has received funding for his research from, for example, European Research Council (ERC), Fraunhofer institut and Academy of Finland. Pulkki is a fellow member of the Audio Engineering Society. In 2014, Pulkki was awarded the Samuel L. Warner Memorial Medal for his significant research work surround and multichannel audio.

Pulkki has co-authored Communication Acoustics with Matti Karjalainen textbook Communication Acoustics: An Introduction to Speech, Audio and Psychoacoustics (2015), published by John Wiley & Sons.

== Awards and honors ==
- Audio Engineering Society Fellow (2010)
- Samuel L. Warner Memorial Medal (2014). Society of Motion Picture and Television Engineers (SMPTE) The award is given of outstanding contributions in the field of spatial sound reproduction and multi-channel audio rendering
- AES Silver Medal (2017) Exceptional contributions in the understanding and development of spatial audio techniques

== Selected publications ==
- Spatial Sound Generation and Perception by Amplitude Panning Techniques (Thesis). 2001. ISBN 951-22-5532-4.
- Pulkki, Ville & Karjalainen, Matti (2015). Communication Acoustics: An Introduction to Speech, Audio and Psychoacoustics. John Wiley & Sons, Ltd. ISBN 978-1-118-86654-2.
