= Matti Antero Karjalainen =

Finnish speech processing researcher and inventor

- Born: April 2, 1946; Hankasalmi, Finland
- Died: May 30, 2010 (aged 64); Espoo, Finland
- Education: Tampere University of Technology (TUT)
- Known for: Synte 2 speech synthesizer
- Awards: Audio Engineering Society Fellow (1999), Audio Engineering Society Silver Medal (2006), IEEE Fellow (2009)
- Scientific career
- Fields: Speech synthesis, Speech analysis, Speech technology, Audio signal processing, Psychoacoustics
- Workplaces: Acoustics Laboratory, Helsinki University of Technology
- Thesis: An Approach to Hierarchical Information Processes with an Application to Speech Synthesis by Rule (1978)
- Doctoral advisor: Boris Segerståhl
- Doctoral students: Vesa Välimäki, Ville Pulkki

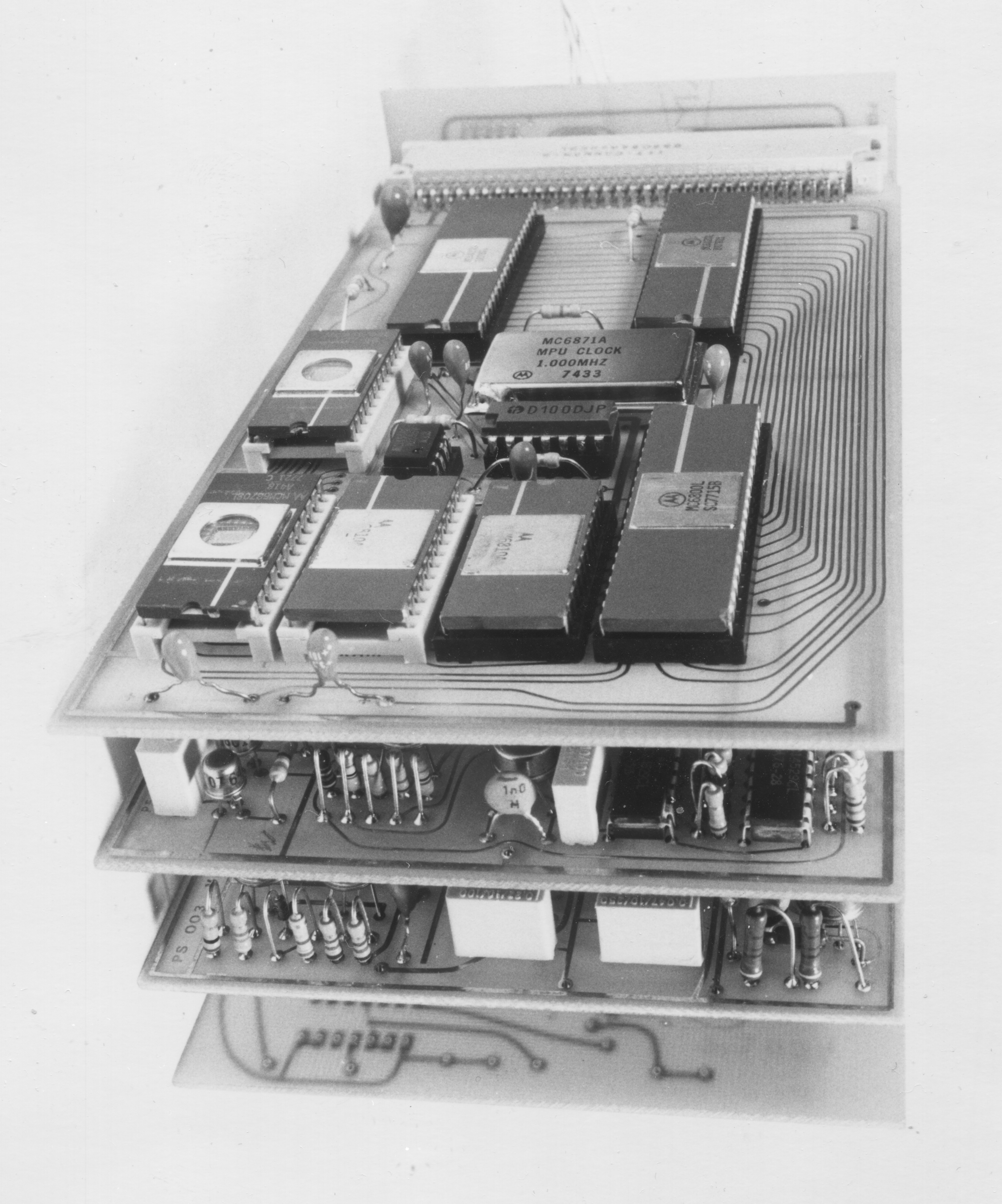
Microprocessor cards of Synte 2 speech synthesizer (1979)

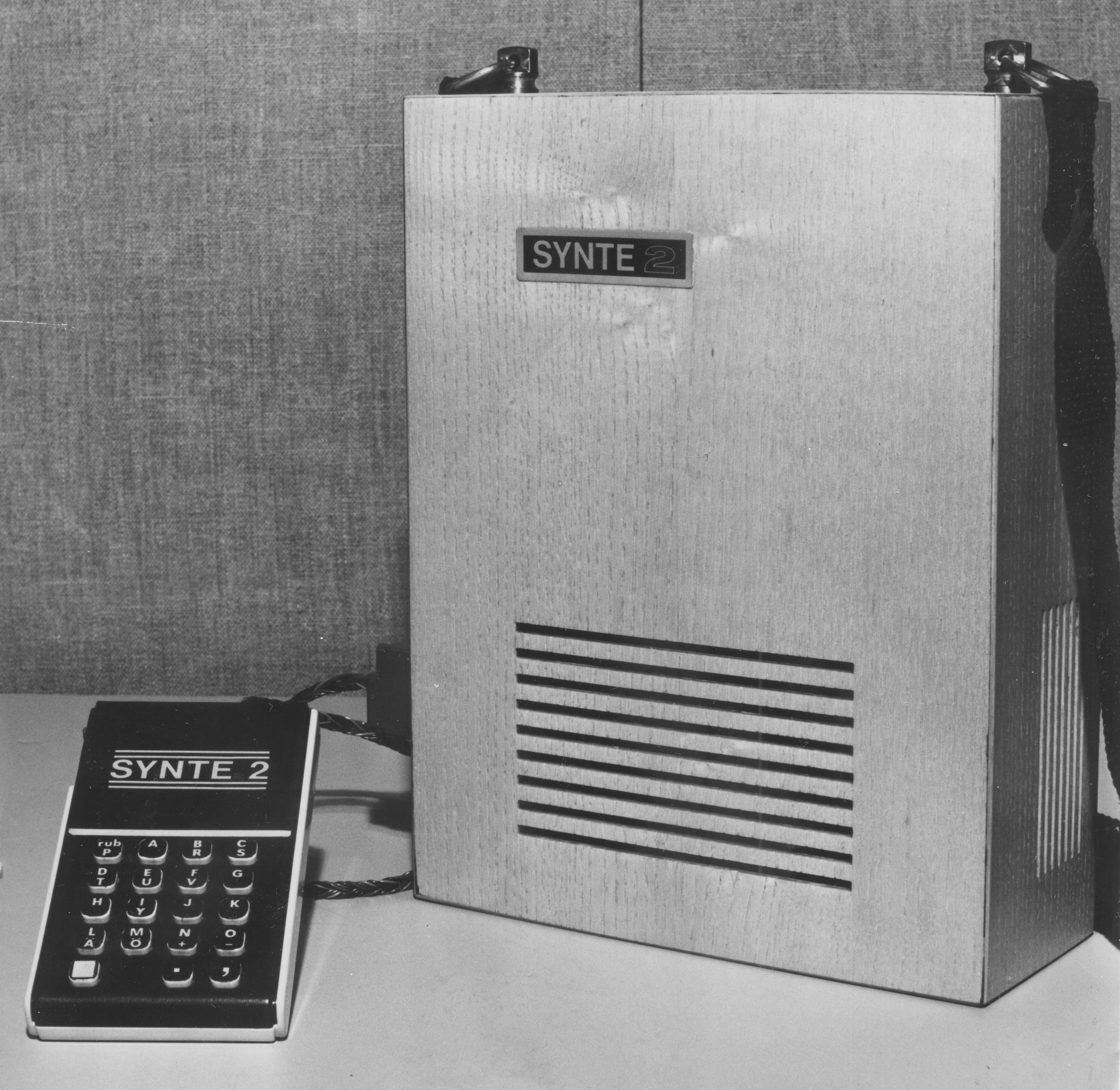
Synte 2 speech synthesizer for speech impaired people (1979)

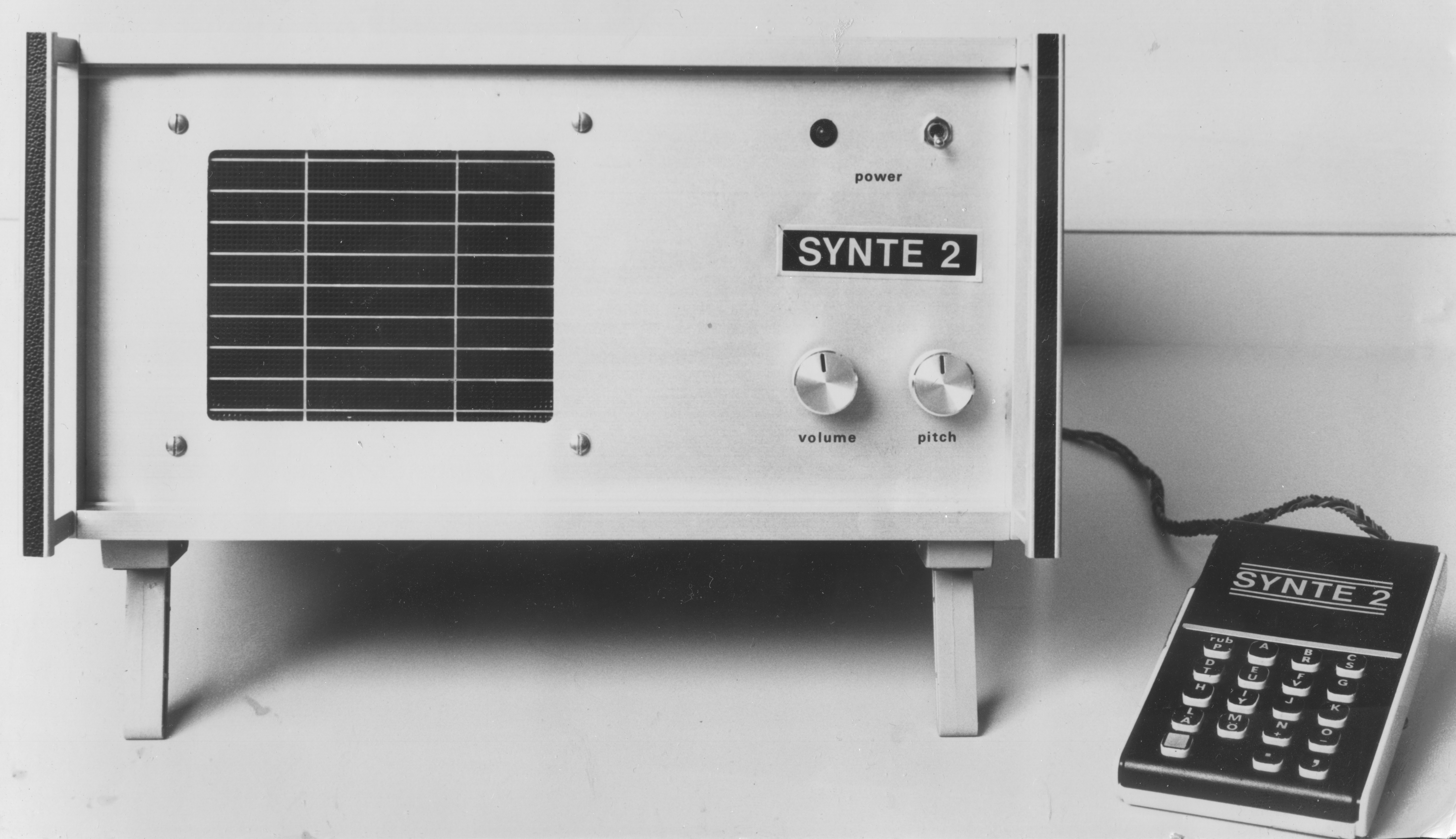
Synte 2 speech synthesizer on the table (1979)

Matti Antero Karjalainen (April 2, 1946 – May 30, 2010) was a Finnish speech processing researcher and inventor in the fields of speech synthesis, speech analysis, speech technology, audio signal processing and psychoacoustics. He was the head of Acoustics Laboratory at the Helsinki University of Technology from 1980 to 2006.

== Education ==
Karjalainen studied electronics at the Tampere University of Technology, where he obtained a M.Sc. (Dipl.Eng.) in 1970, a Lic.Tech. in 1974, and a Dr.Tech. (with honors) in 1978.

== Career ==
Karjalainen created 1979 Synte 2, the first portable text-to-speech synthesizer powered by a microprocessor.

He was the head of Acoustics Laboratory at the Helsinki University of Technology from 1980 to 2006. He became an associate professor in 1980 and a full professor in 1986. He was the supervisor of 24 doctoral theses and over 100 master's theses. His laboratory is now part of the Department of Information and Communications Engineering of the Aalto University.

== Awards and honors ==
- Audio Engineering Society Fellow (1999), for significant contribution to the areas of audio signal processing and education in audio
- Audio Engineering Society Silver Medal (2006), in recognition of outstanding scientific contributions to the audio industry in acoustics, auralization, and digital signal processing and synthesis
- IEEE Fellow (2009)

== Publications ==
=== Thesis ===
- Master's thesis Elektroninen lämpöenergian mittari. Tampereen teknillinen korkeakoulu. 1970. (Electronic thermal energy meter)
- Licentiate thesis Eräiden monikaistasuotimien eli monijakoisten säädettävien amplitudikäyräkorjaimien toimintaperiatteiden ja sovellutusten tutkiminen. Tampereen teknillinen korkeakoulu. 1974. (A Study on Multi-Band Audio Frequency Equalizers)
- PhD thesis An Approach to Hierarchical Information Processes with an Application to Speech Synthesis by Rule. Acta polytechnica Scandinavica. Ma. Tampere University of Technology, Finland. (Acta Polytechnica Scandinavica, Ma 29). 1978. ISBN 951-666-105-X.

=== Articles ===
- Karjalainen, M.A.; Laine, U.K. [in Finnish]; Toivonen, R.O. (1980). "Aids for the handicapped based on "Synte 2" speech synthesizer". ICASSP '80. IEEE International Conference on Acoustics, Speech, and Signal Processing. Vol. 5. ICASSP-80, April 9–11, 1980. pp. 851–854. doi:10.1109/ICASSP.1980.1171070. S2CID 3209817.
- Karjalainen, Matti (1980). Design of a microprocessor-based system for speech analysis. Tampere University of Technology, Department of Electronics, Finland. ISBN 951-720-490-6.

=== Books ===
- Karjalainen, Matti (1986). Kutsu kuulemaan julkista esitelmää, jonka Teknillisen korkeakoulun akustiikan professori Matti Antero Karjalainen pitää virkaanastujaisissaan marraskuun 11. päivänä 1986. (Invitation to hear a public presentation by a professor of acoustics Matti Antero Karjalainen at the University of Technology will hold his inauguration on November 11, 1986), Helsinki University of Technology, Finland. ISBN 951-753-928-2.
- Karjalainen, Matti, ed. (1987). Puheen kuulemisen mallintaminen. Raportti / Teknillinen korkeakoulu. Sähköteknillinen osasto. Akustiikka ja äänenkäsittely. (On the modelling of speech perception). Helsinki University of Technology, Acoustics Laboratory, Finland. ISBN 951-754-154-6.
- Karjalainen, Matti (1999). Kommunikaatioakustiikka. (Communication Acoustics). Helsinki University of Technology, Acoustics Laboratory, Finland. ISBN 951-22-4412-8.
- Karjalainen, Matti (2000). Hieman akustiikkaa (A Little Acoustics). (A Little Acoustics). Helsinki University of Technology, Acoustics Laboratory, Finland.
- Pulkki, Ville; Karjalainen, Matti (2015). Communication Acoustics: An Introduction to Speech, Audio and Psychoacoustics. John Wiley & Sons, Ltd. ISBN 978-1-118-86654-2.
