= Erkki Oja =

Finnish computer scientist

- Born: 22 March 1948 (age 78); Helsinki, Finland
- Education: Helsinki University of Technology
- Known for: Oja's rule
- Awards: Member of the Finnish Academy of Science and Letters (1992); Fellow, International Association for Pattern Recognition (1994); Fellow, IEEE (2000); Knight of the White Rose of Finland (2006); IEEE Computational Intelligence Society Neural Network Pioneer Award (2006); Fellow, International Neural Network Society (2008)
- Scientific career
- Fields: Machine learning Artificial neural networks
- Workplaces: Brown University; Academy of Finland; University of Kuopio; Lappeenranta University of Technology; Aalto University
- Thesis: Studies of the Convergence Properties of Adaptive Orthogonalizing Filters (1977)
- Doctoral advisor: Teuvo Kohonen
- Doctoral students: Aapo Hyvärinen
- Website: users.ics.aalto.fi/oja/

Erkki Oja (born 22 March 1948) is a Finnish computer scientist and Aalto Distinguished Professor in the Department of Information and Computer Science at Aalto University School of Science. He is recognized for developing Oja's rule, which is a model of how neurons in the brain or in artificial neural networks learn over time.

== Early life and education ==
Oja was born in Helsinki and studied at Helsinki University of Technology, where he received his diploma engineer in 1972, licentiate in technology in 1975 and Doctor of Technology in 1977.

== Career ==
Oja was a research associate at the Center for Cognitive Science at Brown University between 1977 and 1978 and a research fellow at the Academy of Finland from 1976 to 1981. Since 1981, he took up a professorship in applied mathematics at Kuopio University (now University of Eastern Finland). He was a visiting research scholar at Tokyo Institute of Technology from 1983 to 1984. From 1987 to 1993, he was a professor in computer science at the Lappeenranta University of Technology. He moved back to the Helsinki University of Technology (now Aalto University) from 1993 as a professor in computer science. He retired in 2015.

== Honors and awards ==
Oja is a Fellow of the International Association for Pattern Recognition and the IEEE, and a member of the Finnish Academy of Sciences. He served as chairman of the European Neural Network Society between 2000 and 2005, and as the chairman of the Academy of Finland’s Research Council for Natural Sciences and Engineering between 2007 and 2012. He was awarded the Frank Rosenblatt Award for his contributions to artificial intelligence research in 2019.

Oja was a member of the Board of Governors for the International Neural Network Society (INNIS) in 2003. He received honorary doctorates from Uppsala University and Lappeenranta University of Technology in 2008.

== Bibliography ==
- Oja, Erkki (1983). Subspace methods of pattern recognition. Letchworth, Hertfordshire, England: Research Studies Press. ISBN 0-86380-010-6. OCLC 9827401.
- Oja, Erkki; Kaski, Samuel, eds. (1999). Kohonen maps. Amsterdam: Elsevier. ISBN 978-0-444-50270-4. OCLC 162130904.
- Hyvärinen, Aapo; Karhunen, Juha; Oja, Erkki (2001). Independent component analysis. New York: J. Wiley. ISBN 0-471-46419-8. OCLC 53228828.
