= U-matrix =

Self-organizing map

The U-matrix (unified distance matrix) is a representation of a self-organizing map (SOM) where the Euclidean distance between the codebook vectors of neighboring neurons is depicted in a grayscale image. This image is used to visualize the data in a high-dimensional space using a 2D image.

== Construction procedure ==
Once the SOM is trained using the input data, the final map is not expected to have any twists. If the map is twist-free, the distance between the codebook vectors of neighboring neurons gives an approximation of the distance between different parts of the underlying data. When such distances are depicted in a grayscale image, light colors depict closely spaced node codebook vectors and darker colors indicate more widely separated node codebook vectors. Thus, groups of light colors can be considered as clusters, and the dark parts as the boundaries between the clusters. This representation can help to visualize the clusters in the high-dimensional spaces, or to automatically recognize them using relatively simple image processing techniques.
