= European Neural Network Society =

- Abbreviation: ENNS
- Formation: June 24, 1991; 35 years ago
- President: Alessio Micheli
- Treasurer: Alessandra Lintas
- Secretary: Domenico Tortorella
- Website: https://e-nns.org

The European Neural Network Society (ENNS) is an association of scientists, engineers, students, and others seeking to learn about and advance understanding of artificial neural networks. Specific areas of interest in this scientific field include modelling of behavioral and brain processes, development of neural algorithms and applying neural modelling concepts to problems relevant in many different domains. Erkki Oja and John G. Taylor are past ENNS presidents and honorary executive board members. As of 2026 its president is Alessio Micheli.

As a non-profit organization, ENNS promotes scientific activities at European and at the national levels in cooperation with national organizations that focus on neural networks. The society gives out the European Neural Network Society Best Paper Award.

== ICANN ==
Every year since 1991 ENNS organizes the International Conference on Artificial Neural Networks (ICANN). The history and the links to past conferences are available at the ENNS website. This is one of the oldest and best established conferences on the subject, with proceedings published in Springer Lecture Notes in Computer Science, see index in DBLP bibliography database.

Every year, many stipends to attend ICANN conference are given. ENNS also sponsors other students and have given awards and prizes at co-sponsored events (schools, workshops, conferences and competitions).

== Presidents ==
The ENNS President, along with Society officers and members of the Executive Committee, is elected for terms of 3 years by the ENNS General Assembly.

Presidents of the ENNS
No.	Name	Term
1	Tuevo Kohonen (1934–2021)	1991–1992
2	John G. Taylor (1931–2012)	1993–1994
3	Christoph von der Malsburg (1942–)	1995–1996
4	Erkki Oja (1948–)	1997–2005
5	Włodzisław Duch	2006–2011
6	Alessandro E. P. Villa	2012–2016
7	Věra Kůrková (1948–)	2017–2019
8	Stefan Wermter	2020–2025
9	Alessio Micheli	2026–In office

== See also ==
- List of artificial intelligence institutions
