= PVLV =

The primary value learned value (PVLV) model is a possible explanation for the reward-predictive firing properties of dopamine (DA) neurons. It simulates behavioral and neural data on Pavlovian conditioning and the midbrain dopaminergic neurons that fire in proportion to unexpected rewards. It is an alternative to the temporal-differences (TD) algorithm.

It is used as part of Leabra.
