= Elastic map =

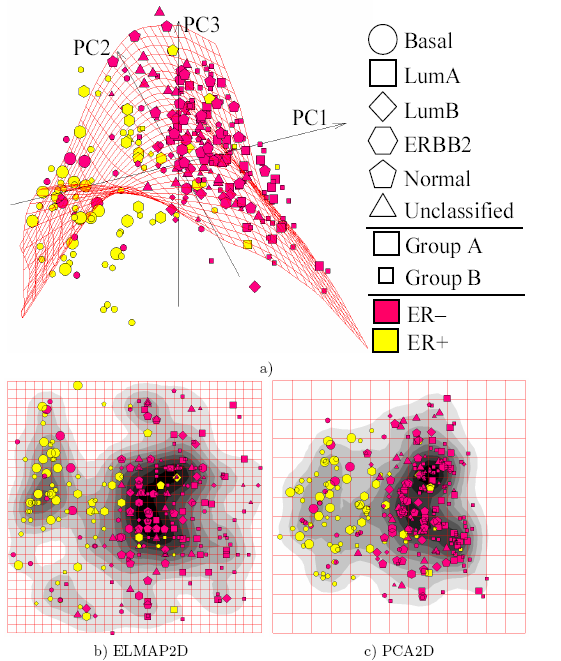
Linear PCA versus nonlinear Principal Manifolds for visualization of breast cancer microarray data: a) Configuration of nodes and 2D Principal Surface in the 3D PCA linear manifold. The dataset is curved and can not be mapped adequately on a 2D principal plane; b) The distribution in the internal 2D non-linear principal surface coordinates (ELMap2D) together with an estimation of the density of points; c) The same as b), but for the linear 2D PCA manifold (PCA2D). The “basal” breast cancer subtype is visualized more adequately with ELMap2D and some features of the distribution become better resolved in comparison to PCA2D. Principal manifolds are produced by the elastic maps algorithm. Data are available for public competition. Software is available for free non-commercial use.

Elastic maps provide a tool for nonlinear dimensionality reduction. By their construction, they are a system of elastic springs embedded in the data space. This system approximates a low-dimensional manifold. The elastic coefficients of this system allow the switch from completely unstructured k-means clustering (zero elasticity) to the estimators located closely to linear PCA manifolds (for high bending and low stretching modules). With some intermediate values of the elasticity coefficients, this system effectively approximates non-linear principal manifolds. This approach is based on a mechanical analogy between principal manifolds, that are passing through "the middle" of the data distribution, and elastic membranes and plates. The method was developed by A.N. Gorban, A.Y. Zinovyev and A.A. Pitenko in 1996–1998.

== Energy of elastic map ==
Let ${\mathcal S}$ be a data set in a finite-dimensional Euclidean space. Elastic map is represented by a set of nodes ${\bf w}_j$ in the same space. Each datapoint $s \in {\mathcal S}$ has a host node, namely the closest node ${\bf w}_j$ (if there are several closest nodes then one takes the node with the smallest number). The data set ${\mathcal S}$ is divided into classes $K_j=\{s \ | \ {\bf w}_j \mbox{ is a host of } s\}$.

The approximation energy D is the distortion

$$D=\frac{1}{2}\sum_{j=1}^k \sum_{s \in K_j}\|s-{\bf w}_j\|^2$$,

which is the energy of the springs with unit elasticity which connect each data point with its host node. It is possible to apply weighting factors to the terms of this sum, for example to reflect the standard deviation of the probability density function of any subset of data points $\{s_i\}$.

On the set of nodes an additional structure is defined. Some pairs of nodes, $({\bf w}_i,{\bf w}_j)$, are connected by elastic edges. Call this set of pairs $E$. Some triplets of nodes, $({\bf w}_i,{\bf w}_j,{\bf w}_k)$, form bending ribs. Call this set of triplets $G$.

The stretching energy is $U_{E}=\frac{1}{2}\lambda \sum_{({\bf w}_i,{\bf w}_j) \in E} \|{\bf w}_i -{\bf w}_j\|^2$,
The bending energy is $U_G=\frac{1}{2}\mu \sum_{({\bf w}_i,{\bf w}_j,{\bf w}_k) \in G} \|{\bf w}_i -2{\bf w}_j+{\bf w}_k\|^2$,

where $\lambda$ and $\mu$ are the stretching and bending moduli respectively. The stretching energy is sometimes referred to as the membrane, while the bending energy is referred to as the thin plate term.

For example, on the 2D rectangular grid the elastic edges are just vertical and horizontal edges (pairs of closest vertices) and the bending ribs are the vertical or horizontal triplets of consecutive (closest) vertices.

The total energy of the elastic map is thus $U=D+U_E+U_G.$

The position of the nodes $\{{\bf w}_j\}$ is determined by the mechanical equilibrium of the elastic map, i.e. its location is such that it minimizes the total energy $U$.

== Expectation-maximization algorithm ==
For a given splitting of dataset ${\mathcal S}$ in classes $K_j$, minimization of the quadratic functional $U$ is a linear problem with the sparse matrix of coefficients. Therefore, similar to principal component analysis or k-means, a splitting method is used:

- For given $\{{\bf w}_j\}$ find $\{K_j\}$;
- For given $\{K_j\}$ minimize $U$ and find $\{{\bf w}_j\}$;
- If no change, terminate.

This expectation-maximization algorithm guarantees a local minimum of $U$. For improving the approximation various additional methods are proposed. For example, the softening strategy is used. This strategy starts with a rigid grids (small length, small bending and large elasticity modules $\lambda$ and $\mu$ coefficients) and finishes with soft grids (small $\lambda$ and $\mu$). The training goes in several epochs, each epoch with its own grid rigidness. Another adaptive strategy is growing net: one starts from a small number of nodes and gradually adds new nodes. Each epoch goes with its own number of nodes.

== Applications ==
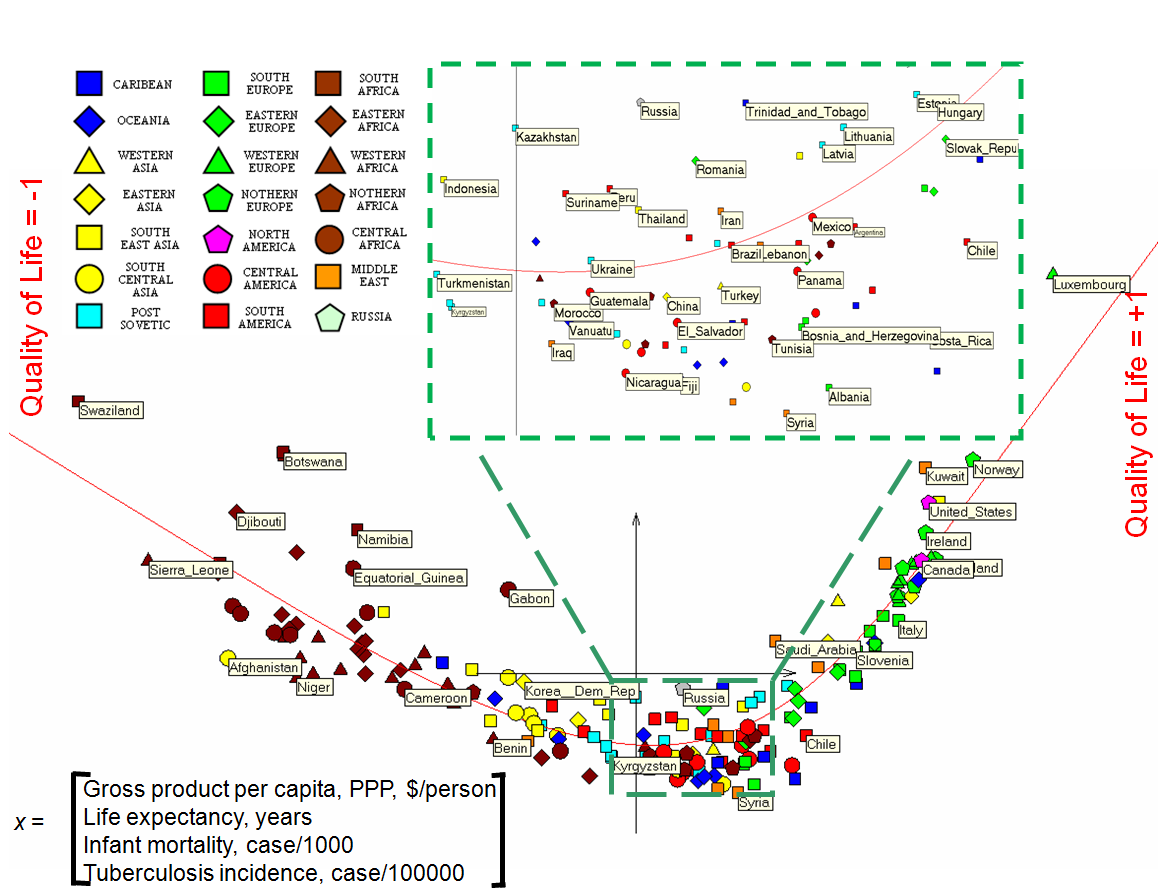
Application of principal curves build by the elastic maps method: Nonlinear quality of life index. Points represent data of the UN 171 countries in 4-dimensional space formed by the values of 4 indicators: gross product per capita, life expectancy, infant mortality, tuberculosis incidence. Different forms and colors correspond to various geographical locations and years. Red bold line represents the principal curve, approximating the dataset.

Most important applications of the method and free software are in bioinformatics for exploratory data analysis and visualisation of multidimensional data, for data visualisation in economics, social and political sciences, as an auxiliary tool for data mapping in geographic informational systems and for visualisation of data of various nature.

The method is applied in quantitative biology for reconstructing the curved surface of a tree leaf from a stack of light microscopy images. This reconstruction is used for quantifying the geodesic distances between trichomes and their patterning, which is a marker of the capability of a plant to resist to pathogenes.

Recently, the method is adapted as a support tool in the decision process underlying the selection, optimization, and management of financial portfolios.

The method of elastic maps has been systematically tested and compared with several machine learning methods on the applied problem of identification of the flow regime of a gas-liquid flow in a pipe. There are various regimes: Single phase water or air flow, Bubbly flow, Bubbly-slug flow, Slug flow, Slug-churn flow, Churn flow, Churn-annular flow, and Annular flow. The simplest and most common method used to identify the flow regime is visual observation. This approach is, however, subjective and unsuitable for relatively high gas and liquid flow rates. Therefore, the machine learning methods are proposed by many authors. The methods are applied to differential pressure data collected during a calibration process. The method of elastic maps provided a 2D map, where the area of each regime is represented. The comparison with some other machine learning methods is presented in Table 1 for various pipe diameters and pressure.

TABLE 1. Flow regime identification accuracy (%) of different machine learning algorithms
	Calibration	Testing	Larger diameter	Higher pressure
Elastic map	100	98.2	100	100
ANN	99.1	89.2	76.2	70.5
SVM	100	88.5	61.7	70.5
SOM (small)	94.9	94.2	83.6	88.6
SOM (large)	100	94.6	82.1	84.1

Here, ANN stands for the backpropagation artificial neural networks, SVM stands for the support vector machine, SOM for the self-organizing maps. The hybrid technology was developed for engineering applications. In this technology, elastic maps are used in combination with Principal Component Analysis (PCA), Independent Component Analysis (ICA) and backpropagation ANN.

The textbook provides a systematic comparison of elastic maps and self-organizing maps (SOMs) in applications to economic and financial decision-making.
