= Error-driven learning =

Reinforcement learning method

In reinforcement learning, error-driven learning is a method for adjusting a model's (intelligent agent's) parameters based on the difference between its output results and the ground truth. These models stand out as they depend on environmental feedback, rather than explicit labels or categories. They are based on the idea that language acquisition involves the minimization of the prediction error (MPSE). By leveraging these prediction errors, the models consistently refine expectations and decrease computational complexity. Typically, these algorithms are operated by the GeneRec algorithm.

Error-driven learning has widespread applications in cognitive sciences and computer vision. These methods have also found successful application in natural language processing (NLP), including areas like part-of-speech tagging, parsing, named entity recognition (NER), machine translation (MT), speech recognition (SR), and dialogue systems.

== Formal Definition ==
Error-driven learning models are ones that rely on the feedback of prediction errors to adjust the expectations or parameters of a model. The key components of error-driven learning include the following:

- A set $S$ of states representing the different situations that the learner can encounter.
- A set $A$ of actions that the learner can take in each state.
- A prediction function $P(s,a)$ that gives the learner's current prediction of the outcome of taking action $a$ in state $s$.
- An error function $E(o,p)$ that compares the actual outcome $o$ with the prediction $p$ and produces an error value.
- An update rule $U(p,e)$ that adjusts the prediction $p$ in light of the error $e$.

== Algorithms ==
Error-driven learning algorithms refer to a category of reinforcement learning algorithms that leverage the disparity between the real output and the expected output of a system to regulate the system's parameters. Typically applied in supervised learning, these algorithms are provided with a collection of input-output pairs to facilitate the process of generalization.

The widely utilized error backpropagation learning algorithm is known as GeneRec, a generalized recirculation algorithm primarily employed for gene prediction in DNA sequences. Many other error-driven learning algorithms are derived from alternative versions of GeneRec.

== Applications ==
=== Cognitive science ===
Error-driven learning has been widely used in cognitive science to describe how expectations and associations are updated according to discrepancies between predicted and observed outcomes. Classical models such as the Rescorla–Wagner model formalize this principle through prediction-error-based changes in associative strength, while subsequent theories have extended prediction-error mechanisms to attention and stimulus associability. Analyses of simple two-layer networks have emphasized the discriminative nature of error-driven learning, in which prediction errors progressively adjust the predictive value of available cues.

Error-driven models have also been applied to higher-level cognitive tasks, including visual categorization and language processing. In neural-network models, increasing architectural depth allows error-driven learning to shape intermediate representations, while algorithms such as backpropagation use output errors to adjust weights across multiple layers.

=== Neuroscience ===
Neural mechanisms of error-driven learning have been studied in the cerebellum, dopamine system, and cerebral cortex. In the cerebellum, climbing-fiber activity provides instructive or error-related signals that guide synaptic plasticity and supervised learning. Related error-based computations have also been examined beyond motor control; in one biologically constrained cerebellar network, prediction-error training supported next-word prediction and the emergence of syntax-related representations.

Phasic midbrain dopamine activity has been linked to reward prediction errors that guide reinforcement learning.

In the cerebral cortex, predictive-coding models propose that top-down pathways convey predictions and bottom-up pathways convey residual errors used to update internal representations. Prediction-error learning has also been proposed to support predictive world models used for prediction, comprehension, and generation, with related computational principles discussed in autoregressive generative AI.

=== Computer vision ===
Computer vision is a complex task that involves understanding and interpreting visual data, such as images or videos.

In the context of error-driven learning, the computer vision model learns from the mistakes it makes during the interpretation process. When an error is encountered, the model updates its internal parameters to avoid making the same mistake in the future. This repeated process of learning from errors helps improve the model's performance over time.

For NLP to do well at computer vision, it employs deep learning techniques. This form of computer vision is sometimes called neural computer vision (NCV), since it makes use of neural networks. NCV therefore interprets visual data based on a statistical, trial and error approach and can deal with context and other subtleties of visual data.

=== Natural Language Processing ===
==== Part-of-speech tagging ====
Part-of-speech (POS) tagging is a crucial component in Natural Language Processing (NLP). It helps resolve human language ambiguity at different analysis levels. In addition, its output (tagged data) can be used in various applications of NLP such as information extraction, information retrieval, question Answering, speech eecognition, text-to-speech conversion, partial parsing, and grammar correction.

==== Parsing ====
Parsing in NLP involves breaking down a text into smaller pieces (phrases) based on grammar rules. If a sentence cannot be parsed, it may contain grammatical errors.

In the context of error-driven learning, the parser learns from the mistakes it makes during the parsing process. When an error is encountered, the parser updates its internal model to avoid making the same mistake in the future. This iterative process of learning from errors helps improve the parser's performance over time.

In conclusion, error-driven learning plays a crucial role in improving the accuracy and efficiency of NLP parsers by allowing them to learn from their mistakes and adapt their internal models accordingly.

==== Named entity recognition (NER) ====
NER is the task of identifying and classifying entities (such as persons, locations, organizations, etc.) in a text. Error-driven learning can help the model learn from its false positives and false negatives and improve its recall and precision on (NER).

In the context of error-driven learning, the significance of NER is quite profound. Traditional sequence labeling methods identify nested entities layer by layer. If an error occurs in the recognition of an inner entity, it can lead to incorrect identification of the outer entity, leading to a problem known as error propagation of nested entities.

This is where the role of NER becomes crucial in error-driven learning. By accurately recognizing and classifying entities, it can help minimize these errors and improve the overall accuracy of the learning process. Furthermore, deep learning-based NER methods have shown to be more accurate as they are capable of assembling words, enabling them to understand the semantic and syntactic relationship between various words better.

==== Machine translation ====
Machine translation is a complex task that involves converting text from one language to another. In the context of error-driven learning, the machine translation model learns from the mistakes it makes during the translation process. When an error is encountered, the model updates its internal parameters to avoid making the same mistake in the future. This iterative process of learning from errors helps improve the model's performance over time.

==== Speech recognition ====
Speech recognition is a complex task that involves converting spoken language into written text. In the context of error-driven learning, the speech recognition model learns from the mistakes it makes during the recognition process. When an error is encountered, the model updates its internal parameters to avoid making the same mistake in the future. This iterative process of learning from errors helps improve the model's performance over time.

==== Dialogue systems ====
Dialogue systems are a popular NLP task as they have promising real-life applications. They are also complicated tasks since many NLP tasks deserving study are involved.

In the context of error-driven learning, the dialogue system learns from the mistakes it makes during the dialogue process. When an error is encountered, the model updates its internal parameters to avoid making the same mistake in the future. This iterative process of learning from errors helps improve the model's performance over time.

== Advantages ==
Error-driven learning has several advantages over other types of machine learning algorithms:

- They can learn from feedback and correct their mistakes, which makes them adaptive and robust to noise and changes in the data.
- They can handle large and high-dimensional data sets, as they do not require explicit feature engineering or prior knowledge of the data distribution.
- They can achieve high accuracy and performance, as they can learn complex and nonlinear relationships between the input and the output.

== Limitations ==
Although error driven learning has its advantages, their algorithms also have the following limitations:

- They can suffer from overfitting, which means that they memorize the training data and fail to generalize to new and unseen data. This can be mitigated by using regularization techniques, such as adding a penalty term to the loss function, or reducing the complexity of the model.
- They can be sensitive to the choice of the error function, the learning rate, the initialization of the weights, and other hyperparameters, which can affect the convergence and the quality of the solution. This requires careful tuning and experimentation, or using adaptive methods that adjust the hyperparameters automatically.
- They can be computationally expensive and time-consuming, especially for nonlinear and deep models, as they require multiple iterations(repetitions) and calculations to update the weights of the system. This can be alleviated by using parallel and distributed computing, or using specialized hardware such as GPUs or TPUs.

== See also ==
- Predictive coding
