= Contrastive Hebbian learning =

Biologically plausible form of Hebbian learning with power equivalent to backpropagation

Contrastive Hebbian learning is a biologically plausible form of Hebbian learning.

It is based on the contrastive divergence algorithm, which has been used to train a variety of energy-based latent variable models.

In 2003, contrastive Hebbian learning was shown to be equivalent in power to the backpropagation algorithms commonly used in machine learning.

== See also ==
- Oja's rule
- Generalized Hebbian algorithm
