= Teuvo Kohonen =

Finnish computer scientist (1934–2021)

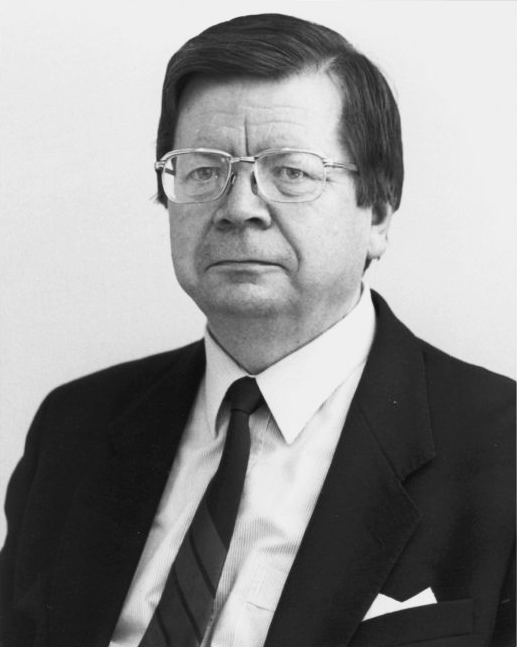
- Born: Teuvo Kohonen; 11 July 1934; Lauritsala, Finland
- Died: 13 December 2021 (aged 87); Espoo, Finland
- Education: Helsinki University of Technology
- Known for: Self-organizing map Learning vector quantization
- Awards: IEEE Neural Networks Council Pioneer Award (1991); International Neural Network Society Lifetime Achievement Award (1992); IEEE Signal Processing Society Technical Achievement Award (1995); IEEE Fellow
- Scientific career
- Fields: Machine learning Artificial neural networks
- Workplaces: Helsinki University of Technology; Academy of Finland
- Doctoral students: Erkki Oja

Teuvo Kalevi Kohonen (11 July 1934 – 13 December 2021) was a Finnish computer scientist. He was professor emeritus of the Academy of Finland.

== Career ==
Kohonen studied at the Helsinki University of Technology and graduated with a master's degree in engineering in 1957. He received his doctorate in 1962 and stayed at the university with a faculty position until 1993. He was an academy professor of the Academy of Finland between 1975 and 1999.

During doctorate, he worked on the quantum electrodynamics of the scattering of polarized electrons and positrons, and measured the lifetime of positrons to accuracy of $10^{-11} s$.

During most of his career, Kohonen conducted research at Helsinki University of Technology (TKK). The Neural Networks Research Centre of TKK, a center of excellence appointed by Academy of Finland was founded to conduct research related to Kohonen's innovations. After Kohonen's retirement, the center was led by Erkki Oja and later renamed to Adaptive Informatics Research Centre with widened foci of research.

Kohonen made contributions to the field of artificial neural networks, including the Learning Vector Quantization algorithm, fundamental theories of distributed associative memory and optimal associative mappings, the learning subspace method and novel algorithms for symbol processing like redundant hash addressing. He published several books and over 300 peer-reviewed papers.

Kohonen's most famous contribution is the self-organizing map, or "SOM" (also known as the "Kohonen map" or "Kohonen artificial neural network"; Kohonen himself prefers "SOM"). Due to the popularity of the SOM algorithm in research and in practical applications, Kohonen is often considered to be the most cited Finnish scientist. The current version of the SOM bibliography contains close to 8,000 entries.

Kohonen died on 13 December 2021, at the age of 87.

== Honors and awards ==
Kohonen was elected the First Vice President of the International Association for Pattern Recognition from 1982 to 1984, and acted as the first president of the European Neural Network Society from 1991 to 1992.

For his scientific achievements, Kohonen received a number of prizes including the following:

- IEEE Neural Networks Council Pioneer Award, 1991
- Technical Achievement Award of the IEEE Signal Processing Society, 1995
- IEEE Frank Rosenblatt Award, 2008

== Bibliography ==
- Kohonen, Teuvo (1988). "An introduction to neural computing". Neural Networks. 1 (1): 3–16. doi:10.1016/0893-6080(88)90020-2.

=== Books ===
- Kohonen, Teuvo (1972). Digital circuits and devices. Prentice-Hall networks series. Englewood Cliffs, N.J: Prentice-Hall. ISBN 978-0-13-214122-2.
- Kohonen, Teuvo (1977). Associative Memory. Communication and Cybernetics. Vol. 17. Berlin, Heidelberg: Springer Berlin Heidelberg. doi:10.1007/978-3-642-96384-1. ISBN 978-3-642-96386-5.
- Kohonen, Teuvo (1987). Content-Addressable Memories. Springer Series in Information Sciences. Vol. 1. Berlin, Heidelberg: Springer Berlin Heidelberg. doi:10.1007/978-3-642-83056-3. ISBN 978-3-540-17625-1.
- Kohonen, Teuvo (1989). Self-Organization and Associative Memory. Springer Series in Information Sciences. Vol. 8. Berlin, Heidelberg: Springer Berlin Heidelberg. doi:10.1007/978-3-642-88163-3. ISBN 978-3-540-51387-2.
- Kohonen, Teuvo (2001) [1995]. Schroeder, M. R.; Huang, T. S. (eds.). Self-Organizing Maps. Information Sciences (3rd ed.). Berlin & Heidelberg: Springer. ISBN 978-3540679219.
- Deboeck, Guido; Kohonen, Teuvo, eds. (1998). Visual Explorations in Finance. Springer Finance. London: Springer London. doi:10.1007/978-1-4471-3913-3. ISBN 978-1-84996-999-4.
