= Almeida–Pineda recurrent backpropagation =

Almeida–Pineda recurrent backpropagation is an extension to the backpropagation algorithm that is applicable to recurrent neural networks. It is a type of supervised learning. It was described somewhat cryptically in Richard Feynman's senior thesis, and rediscovered independently in the context of artificial neural networks by both Fernando Pineda and Luis B. Almeida.

A recurrent neural network for this algorithm consists of some input units, some output units and eventually some hidden units.

For a given set of (input, target) states, the network is trained to settle into a stable activation state with the output units in the target state, based on a given input state clamped on the input units.
