= Audience (company) =

Audio Processing Company

- Company type: Subsidiary
- Industry: Semiconductors
- Founded: 2000
- Founder: Dr. Lloyd Watts
- Headquarters: United States
- Key people: Peter Santos, President & CEO
- Parent: Knowles Corporation
- Website: Audience.com

Audience was an American mobile voice and audio-processing company based in Mountain View, California, and was one of the 34 founding members of The Open Handset Alliance. The company went public in May 2012 on the NASDAQ exchange under the symbol ADNC. They specialized in improving voice clarity and noise suppression for a broad range of consumer products, including cellular phones, mobile devices and PCs. They were bought by Knowles for $130 Million in 3Q15 who changed its name to Knowles Intelligent Audio.

Audience was the first company to have reverse-engineered the human hearing system and model its processes onto a chip, enabling computers and mobile devices to use the same kind of “auditory intelligence” that humans employ. By using this technology in conjunction with two or more microphones, background noise is suppressed, improving the quality of the remaining voice and reducing distraction for the listener. This technology mimics the “cocktail party effect”.

In 2010, Audience partnered with HTC to integrate its noise suppression technology into the Google Nexus One smartphone. The next year AT&T introduced eight different handsets powered by Audience's earSmart technology including the Samsung Galaxy S III Skyrocket and the HTC Vivid.

In 2013, Audience unveiled its combination voice processor and audio codec

== Background ==
The company's technology has shipped in more than 140 devices including the Nexus One, Samsung Galaxy S, Galaxy S 4, Galaxy Note, the iPhone4 and 4S, and the LG G2. Audience also works with other mobile phone manufacturers such as Huawei, Google, HTC, Sharp, Pantech, ZTE and others. In 2010, the company announced a collaboration with AT&T to deliver its advanced voice capabilities to AT&T devices and is engaged with multiple operators around the world. Most recently the company announced its first design implementation in the PC space with the Dell Vostro 5460.

== Products ==
Audience had two lines of processors, Advanced Voice and Smart Sound, both branded as "earSmart." Advanced Voice processors come in a variety of models, the eS110 (supports 1 microphone), eS305 and eS310 (supports 2 microphones) and the company's latest generation eS325 (supports 3 microphones), which was announced at Mobile World Congress 2013.

Smart Sound processors combined the Advanced Voice processor feature set (HD call quality, wideband noise suppression, bandwidth expansion, acoustic echo cancelation, and improved performance for Automatic Speech Recognition) with a stereo audio codec. The company introduced its Smart Sound processor category at Consumer Electronics Show 2013 with the launch of the eS515. The eS515 has three-microphone noise suppression, improved ASR (assisted speech recognition), and other features. Later that year, the company announced a similar product, eS325.

== Technology ==
The company's technology was built around the foundation of Computational Auditory Scene Analysis (CASA) -- a field of study that builds on the concept of Auditory Scene Analysis (ASA), a term first coined by psychologist Albert Bregman. ASA enables humans to accurately group sounds—even when composed of multiple frequencies, as in music, or when heard simultaneously –- and avoid blending "sources." As a result, ASA allows the listener to correctly distinguish and identify a sound of interest, like a voice, from other noise sources.

CASA attempts to recreate sound source separation in the same manner as human hearing, but in machines. Using the principles of CASA, Audience's earSmart processors act like a human cochlea and group different sounds, based on a diverse list of cues such as pitch, onset/offset time, spatial location and harmonicity. These simultaneous sounds are evaluated and grouped by source. In doing this, the microphones of a mobile device, together with Audience's proprietary "Fast Cochlea Transform" technology, can identify and group sounds which are classified as noise, remove or at least reduce them, and leave the remaining clear voice signal intact.
