= CSP =

CSP may refer to:

== Education ==
- College Student Personnel, an academic discipline
- Commonwealth Supported Place, a category in Australian education
- Concordia University (Saint Paul, Minnesota), US

== Organizations ==
- Caledonian Steam Packet Company, Scotland
- California Society of Printmakers, US
- Cambridge Scholars Publishing, UK
- Canadian Ski Patrol
- Center for Security Policy, a think tank in Washington, D.C., US
- Chartered Society of Physiotherapy, UK
- Christopher Street Project, interest group and nonprofit in Washington, D.C., US
- Council on Spiritual Practices, US
- Paulist Fathers or the Congregation of St. Paul

=== Government ===
- California State Police, US
- Civil Services of Pakistan
- Colorado State Patrol, US
- Committee of Public Safety, France (1793-95)
- Connecticut State Police, US

=== Political parties ===
- Chicago Socialist Party, US
- Christian Social Party (disambiguation)
- Christian Solidarity Party, Ireland
- Christlich Soziale Partei (Belgium)
- Congress Socialist Party, India
- Building Societies of Peace, (Spanish: Construyendo Sociedades de Paz), Mexico

=== Transportation ===
- Camas Prairie Railroad, Idaho, US
- Camas Prairie RailNet, shortline railroad formerly owned by North American RailNet, US
- Casper Air Service (ICAO airline designator)

== Science and technology ==
- Chiral stationary phase, in chiral column chromatography
- Concentrated solar power, a type of design for electricity generation and water warming
- Crystal structure prediction
- Cavum septi pellucidi, a common variation observed in brain anatomy
- Compulsive skin picking
- Chemosensory protein
- Cyclic sieving phenomenon, in combinatorics and representation theory
- Circumsporozoite protein
- Competence stimulating peptide

=== Computing ===
- Credential service provider, a trusted entity
- Common spatial pattern, in signal processing and statistical data analysis
- Carriage service provider
- Chip-scale package, or chip-size package
- Client-side prediction, a network programming technique in video games
- Communicating sequential processes, a formal language for describing patterns of interaction in concurrent systems
- Communications service provider, for example telecommunications
- Constraint satisfaction problem, a formalism for defining constrained decision problems
- Content Security Policy, a security standard introduced to prevent certain kinds of cross-site scripting-based attacks
- Control Storage Processor, a processor architecture used in the IBM System/32, IBM System/34 and IBM System/36 computers
- Critical security parameter, in cryptography
- IBM Cross System Product, a defunct 4GL for IBM mainframes
- Cryptographic Service Provider, in Microsoft Windows
- Cubesat Space Protocol, a small network-layer delivery protocol for cubesats
- Cloud service provider
- Clip Studio Paint, digital art software

== Other uses ==
- Centro Sportivo Paraibano, Brazilian football (soccer) club
- Certified Scrum Professional, a certification for Scrum Agile Project Management
- Certified Safety Professional, an accredited status in the United States
- Certified Speaking Professional, an accredited status in the US
- Club Sportivo Patria, Argentinian football club
- Conservation Security Program, a voluntary agricultural land conservation program in the US
- Corporate sustainable profitability
- Council Shoulder Patch, insignia of the Boy Scouts of America
- Limoges CSP, a French basketball club
- IOC sport code for canoe sprint at the Summer Olympics

== See also ==
- List of California state parks
