= Source separation =

Source separation may refer to:

- Signal separation, the analysis of mixtures of signals
  - Blind source separation, the separation of a set of source signals from a set of mixed signals, without the aid of information (or with very little information) about the source signals or the mixing process
- Source separation (recycling), where each material is cleaned and sorted prior to collection
- Waste sorting, the process by which waste is separated into different elements
- Urine separation, the separate collection of human urine and feces at the point of their production, i.e. at the toilet or urinal
