= Factorial (disambiguation) =

The factorial of a number $n$ is $n!=n\cdot(n-1)\cdot(n-2)\cdots$, the product of positive integers up to $n$.

Factorial may also refer to:

- Factorial experiment, a statistical experiment over all combinations of values
- Factorial code, data representation by independent components
- Factorial (company), Spanish software company
