= Albert Bregman =

Canadian cognitive psychologist (1936–2023)

Albert Stanley Bregman FRSC
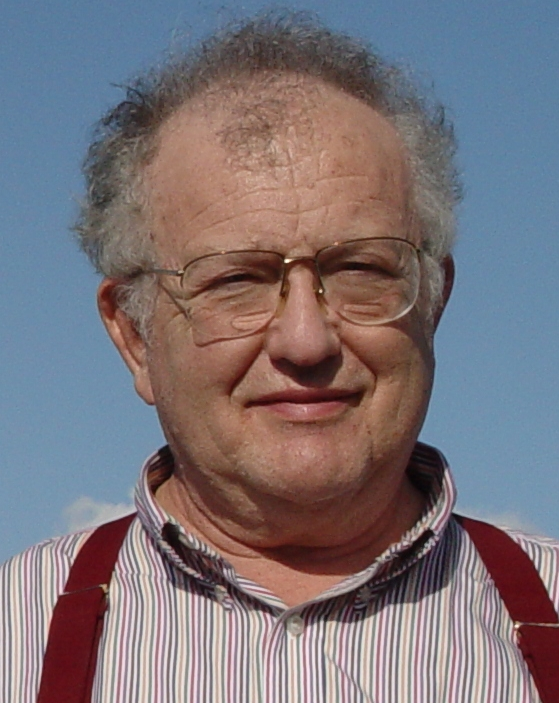
- Bregman in 2011
- Born: September 15, 1936; Toronto, Ontario, Canada
- Died: May 18, 2023 (aged 86); Montreal, Quebec, Canada
- Education: University of Toronto, Yale University
- Known for: Auditory scene analysis
- Scientific career
- Fields: Auditory scene analysis, experimental psychology, cognitive science
- Workplaces: McGill University
- Thesis: Distribution of Practice in Verbal Learning (1963)
- Doctoral advisor: Frederick D. Sheffield
- Other academic advisors: Endel Tulving; Carl I. Hovland

Albert Stanley Bregman FRSC (September 15, 1936 – May 18, 2023) was a Canadian academic and researcher in the fields of experimental psychology, cognitive science, and Gestalt psychology.

In his 1990 publication Auditory Scene Analysis: The Perceptual Organization of Sound, Bregman conceptualized and defined the field of auditory scene analysis (ASA). His ideas about ASA provided a foundation for further research into the auditory systems of both humans and animals, for behavioral and neurological studies of speech perception, and for computational auditory scene analysis. Psychological researcher Stanley Coren has described Bregman as "the father of auditory scene analysis" in acknowledgement of his contributions to the field.

Upon arriving at McGill University in 1965, Bregman became the first professor there to teach cognitive psychology. He held a post-retirement appointment of emeritus professor in the university's Department of Psychology until his death in 2023. Many of Bregman's former pupils at McGill went on to make significant contributions to the fields of psychology and cognitive science, including Steven Pinker, Paul Bloom, Stevan Harnad, Marcel Just, Susan Pinker and Alison Gopnik.

== Biography ==
=== Personal life ===
Albert Bregman was born to a Jewish family in Toronto, Ontario on September 15, 1936. His father, Harry Bregman, was an office manager, while his mother, Mary (nee Abel) Bregman was a homemaker.

In 1976, Albert married Abigail Sibley, an artist and history professor from Montreal, Quebec. The couple had five stepchildren: Sylvia, Francoise, Michel, Patrick, and Eileen.

Bregman died on May 18, 2023, at the age of 86.

=== Academic career ===
In 1957, Bregman graduated from the University College of Toronto with a Bachelor of Arts degree in philosophy. He received a master's degree in psychology from the same school in 1959, after which he worked as a research assistant for experimental psychologist Endel Tulving, studying how subjective organization affected the process of memorization. In 1959, Bregman enrolled in a Ph.D program at Yale University, studying the formation of concepts with psychologist Carl Hovland. Following Hovland's death in 1961, Bregman completed his dissertation on human memory under the supervision of Fred D. Sheffield, and graduated from Yale in 1963.

From 1962 to 1965, Bregman was a research fellow at the Center for Cognitive Studies at Harvard University, where he continued to study memory. There, he and Donald A. Norman used a PDP-4 minicomputer to set up one of the earliest computer systems for controlling psychological experiments. Bregman also taught two courses in Harvard's psychology department; the laboratory section of an experimental psychology course taught by Richard Herrnstein, and a graduate seminar in learning theory.

Bregman arrived at McGill University in 1965 as an assistant professor in the Department of Psychology. He subsequently rose to the rank of full professor, and received a lifetime appointment as an emeritus professor following his retirement in 1999. He spent sabbatical periods at Cornell University, the University of Sussex, and at Stanford University, where he formed an association with the Center for Computer Research in Music and Acoustics (CCRMA), founded by John Chowning. Bregman gave lectures on auditory scene analysis at many universities, including Harvard, MIT, Yale, Oxford, and Cambridge, and traveled to Japan to host talks at several companies, including Advanced Technology Research in Kyoto, Nippon Telegraph and Telephone, and the Kitano Symbiotic Systems Project in Tokyo.

==== Auditory scene analysis ====
Bregman's initial research at McGill was a continuation of his earlier research on memory. In 1969, while recording a rapid succession of sounds for a learning experiment, he made a significant discovery that prompted his interest in the field of auditory perception research:

"I was preparing an experiment on learning, involving a rapid sequence of unrelated sounds, each about the length of a speech phoneme. I spliced together one-tenth-second segments of many different sounds – water splashing in a sink, a dentist's drill, a tone, a vowel, etc. When I played the tape back to myself, though, I did not experience the sequences in the order that they were recorded on the tape. It appeared that non-adjacent sounds were grouping and appeared to be adjacent. It was the similar sounds that seemed to be forming integrated perceptual sequences. This reminded me of an essay I had written at the University of Toronto on the topic of Gestalt Psychology. Some of the Gestaltists' examples showed that similar visual forms would group and segregate from dissimilar ones. Perhaps an analogous sort of grouping might be happening in my auditory sequence. Although I had never been trained in auditory perception research, this one subjective experience set me off on 36 years of study."

To support this research, Bregman used a PDP-11 computer to develop a laboratory for working with auditory and visual signals and testing human subjects.

Bregman developed and defined the concept of auditory stream segregation (also known as "streaming") to describe how a single sequence of sounds could be interpreted by the human auditory system as two or more concurrent streams of sound. Extensive research by Bregman and his students uncovered many of the acoustic variables that controlled this process. Eventually, Bregman came to contextualize streaming as a part of a larger auditory process, which he called "auditory scene analysis" (ASA), and defined as a process responsible for analyzing the mixture of sound that reaches a listener's ears and building distinct perceptual representations of the individual acoustic sources buried in the mixture.

Bregman's work on ASA has had a significant impact outside the field of experimental psychology. His principles of ASA have been instrumental in the field of computational auditory scene analysis (CASA), and in the development of computer systems that automatically carry out ASA by segregating speech from other concurrent sounds. Bregman's principles have also been applied to music, in order to explain the segregation and integration of musical sounds, and have found further applications in speech perception. ASA has been observed in newborns and in non-human animals, suggesting an innate basis for the process.

In 1992, Bregman set up an electronic mailing list on the topic of auditory perception. Administered by Daniel P. Ellis of Columbia University, it includes over 2500 researchers and practitioners of auditory science in 45 countries.

== Honors and awards ==
Bregman was elected as a fellow of the Canadian Psychological Association (CPA) in 1978, the American Psychological Association in 1984, and the Royal Society of Canada in 1995. From 1984 to 1986, he held a Killam Research Fellowship from the Canada Council for the Arts. In 1995, he was awarded the Jacques Rousseau Medal for interdisciplinary contributions by the Association francophone pour le savoir of Quebec. In 2004, he received the CPA Donald O. Hebb Award for Distinguished Contributions to Psychology as a Science, and in 2012, the Governor General of Canada awarded him the Queen Elizabeth II Diamond Jubilee Medal.

Bregman's extensive research on ASA has yielded one book, three encyclopedia articles, 16 book chapters, and 53 papers in scientific journals. In addition, he has published 12 scientific articles on various perception-related topics, and six additional publications on human memory.

== Selected publications ==
=== Books ===
- Bregman, A.S. (1990). Auditory Scene Analysis: The Perceptual Organization of Sound. Cambridge, Mass.: Bradford Books, MIT Press. (Paperback, 1994).

=== Audio compact disk ===
- Bregman, A.S., & Ahad, P.A. (1996) Demonstrations of Auditory Scene Analysis: The Perceptual Organization of Sound. Audio compact disk. (Distributed by MIT Press).

=== Articles in encyclopedias and handbooks ===
- Bregman, A.S. (2004) Auditory scene analysis. In N.J. Smelzer & P.B. Baltes (Eds.) International Encyclopedia of the Social and Behavioral Sciences. Amsterdam: Pergamon (Elsevier). pp. 940–942.
- Bregman, A.S. (2008) Auditory scene analysis. In Encyclopedia of Neuroscience. (L.R. Squire, Editor.) Oxford: Academic Press.
- Bregman, A.S. (2007) Auditory scene analysis. In A.I. Basbaum, A. Koneko, G.M. Shepherd & G.Westheimer (Eds.) The Senses: A Comprehensive Reference, Vol. 3, Audition, P. Dallos & D. Oertel (Volume Eds.) San Diego: Academic Press, 2008, pp. 861–870.

=== Selected book chapters ===
- Bregman, A.S. (1978). The formation of auditory streams. In J. Réquin (Ed.), Attention and Performance VII. Hillsdale, New Jersey: Lawrence Erlbaum.
- Bregman, A.S. (1981). Asking the "what for" question in auditory perception. In M. Kubovy and J.R. Pomerantz (Eds.), Perceptual Organization. Hillsdale, New Jersey: Lawrence Erlbaum.
- Bregman, A.S. (1993). Auditory scene analysis: Listening in complex environments. In S.E. McAdams, and E. Bigand (Eds.) Thinking in sound. London: Oxford University Press, pp. 10–36.
- Bregman, A.S. (1998). Psychological data and computational ASA. In David F. Rosenthal and Hiroshi G. Okuno (Eds.), Computational Auditory Scene Analysis. Mahwah, NJ: Erlbaum.

=== Selected papers in scientific journals ===
- Bregman, A.S. (1966). "Is recognition memory all-or-none?". Journal of Verbal Learning and Verbal Behavior. 5: 1–6. doi:10.1016/s0022-5371(66)80098-1.
- Bregman, A.S. (1967). "Distribution of practice and between-trials interference". Canadian Journal of Psychology. 21 (1): 1–14. doi:10.1037/h0082962. PMID 6038382.
- Bregman, A.S.; Campbell, J. (1971). "Primary auditory stream segregation and perception of order in rapid sequences of tones". Journal of Experimental Psychology. 89 (2): 244–249. CiteSeerX 10.1.1.615.7744. doi:10.1037/h0031163. PMID 5567132.
- Moeser, S.D.; Bregman, A.S. (1972). "The role of reference in the acquisition of a miniature artificial language". Journal of Verbal Learning and Verbal Behavior. 11 (6): 759–769. doi:10.1016/s0022-5371(72)80010-0.
- Bregman, A.S. (1977). "Perception and behavior as compositions of ideals". Cognitive Psychology. 9 (2): 250–292. doi:10.1016/0010-0285(77)90009-3. S2CID 54312561.
- Bregman, A.S. (1978). "Auditory streaming is cumulative". Journal of Experimental Psychology: Human Perception and Performance. 4 (3): 380–387. doi:10.1037/0096-1523.4.3.380. PMID 681887.
- Bregman, A.S. (1978). "Auditory streaming: competition among alternative organizations". Perception & Psychophysics. 23 (5): 391–398. doi:10.3758/bf03204141. PMID 683823.
- Bregman, A.S.; Pinker (1978). "Auditory streaming and the building of timbre". Canadian Journal of Psychology. 32 (1): 19–31. doi:10.1037/h0081664. PMID 728845.
- McAdams, S.; Bregman, A.S. "Hearing musical streams. (1979)". Computer Music Journal. 3: 26–43.
- Bregman, A.S. (1981). "Chomsky without language". Cognition. 10 (1–3): 33–38. doi:10.1016/0010-0277(81)90022-6. PMID 7198556. S2CID 43256721.
- Bregman, A.S.; Mills, M.I. (1982). "Perceived movement: the Flintstone constraint". Perception. 11 (2): 201–206. doi:10.1068/p110201. PMID 7155772. S2CID 45368384.
- Wright, J.K.; Bregman, A.S. (1987). "Auditory stream segregation and the control of dissonance in polyphonic music". Contemporary Music Review. 2: 63–92. doi:10.1080/07494468708567054.
- Bregman, A.S.; Liao, C.; Levitan, R. (1990). "Auditory grouping based on fundamental frequency and formant peak frequency". Canadian Journal of Psychology. 44 (3): 400–413. doi:10.1037/h0084255. PMID 2224643.
- Rogers, W.L.; Bregman, A.S. (1998). "Cumulation of the tendency to segregate auditory streams: Resetting by changes in location and loudness". Perception & Psychophysics. 60 (7): 1216–1227. doi:10.3758/bf03206171. PMID 9821783.
- Bregman, A.S. (2005). "Auditory Scene Analysis and the Role of Phenomenology in Experimental Psychology". Canadian Psychology. 46 (1): 32–40. doi:10.1037/h0085822.
- Sussman, E.; Bregman, A. S.; Wang, W.J.; Khan, F.J. (2005). "Attentional modulation of electrophysiological activity in auditory cortex for unattended sounds in multi-stream auditory environments". Cognitive, Affective, & Behavioral Neuroscience. 5 (1): 93–110. doi:10.3758/cabn.5.1.93. PMID 15913011.
