= Kernel-independent component analysis =

In statistics, kernel-independent component analysis (kernel ICA) is an efficient algorithm for independent component analysis which estimates source components by optimizing a generalized variance contrast function, which is based on representations in a reproducing kernel Hilbert space. Those contrast functions use the notion of mutual information as a measure of statistical independence.

== Main idea ==
Kernel ICA is based on the idea that correlations between two random variables can be represented in a reproducing kernel Hilbert space (RKHS), denoted by $\mathcal{F}$, associated with a feature map $L_x: \mathcal{F} \mapsto \mathbb{R}$ defined for a fixed $x \in \mathbb{R}$. The $\mathcal{F}$-correlation between two random variables $X$ and $Y$ is defined as

$$\rho_{\mathcal{F}}(X,Y) = \max_{f, g \in \mathcal{F}} \operatorname{corr}( \langle L_X,f \rangle, \langle L_Y,g \rangle)$$

where the functions $f,g: \mathbb{R} \to \mathbb{R}$ range over $\mathcal{F}$ and

$$\operatorname{corr}( \langle L_X,f \rangle, \langle L_Y,g \rangle) :=  \frac{\operatorname{cov}(f(X), g(Y)) }{\operatorname{var}(f(X))^{1/2} \operatorname{var}(g(Y))^{1/2} }$$

for fixed $f,g \in \mathcal{F}$. Note that the reproducing property implies that $f(x) = \langle L_x, f \rangle$ for fixed $x \in \mathbb{R}$ and $f \in \mathcal{F}$. It follows then that the $\mathcal{F}$-correlation between two independent random variables is zero.

This notion of $\mathcal{F}$-correlations is used for defining contrast functions that are optimized in the Kernel ICA algorithm. Specifically, if $\mathbf{X} := (x_{ij}) \in \mathbb{R}^{n \times m}$ is a prewhitened data matrix, that is, the sample mean of each column is zero and the sample covariance of the rows is the $m \times m$ dimensional identity matrix, Kernel ICA estimates a $m \times m$ dimensional orthogonal matrix $\mathbf{A}$ so as to minimize finite-sample $\mathcal{F}$-correlations between the columns of $\mathbf{S} := \mathbf{X} \mathbf{A}^{\prime}$.
