= Groove shadow =

Music production technique

Groove shadow is a method of sound design used in music production. The groove shadow loops are sourced and crafted from found sounds, then programmed into a musical orientation. They can then be implemented to suit a given application. They are used in modern music to alter existing material, and especially for the purpose of sonically "stimulating" elements of audio productions. Additionally, groove shadows conform to many genres of music production; they can act as their own genre and/or can be used in different stages of the music creation process (for example as a motif). In short, groove shadows are sound effects made musical. A quick method to generate a Groove shadow is from the utilization of tools based around Music Source Separation because of their spectral selection based processing capabilities.

== History ==
The first known use of the term used in a commercial context for musical application was for the Groove Shadows sample CD released by Ueberschall Sample Service in 2002. The next commercial release would come in the form of Groove Shadow Elastik which featured a larger supply of the loops as well as an audio engine (Elastik) capable of aiding in the adaptation of the loops to projects.

== As a reverb treatment ==
Groove shadow can also refer to a technique of using reverb (wet) from one drum part under another drum that does not have the same reverb and then applying a compressor with side-chain set to follow the main (dry) drum. This creates unique syncopation for the perception of the drums groove.
