= Joint Approximation Diagonalization of Eigen-matrices =

Independent component analysis algorithm

Joint Approximation Diagonalization of Eigen-matrices (JADE) is an algorithm for independent component analysis that separates observed mixed signals into latent source signals by exploiting fourth order moments. The fourth order moments are a measure of non-Gaussianity, which is used as a proxy for defining independence between the source signals. The motivation for this measure is that Gaussian distributions possess zero excess kurtosis, and with non-Gaussianity being a canonical assumption of ICA, JADE seeks an orthogonal rotation of the observed mixed vectors to estimate source vectors which possess high values of excess kurtosis.

== Algorithm ==
Let $\mathbf{X} = (x_{ij}) \in \mathbb{R}^{m \times n}$ denote an observed data matrix whose $n$ columns correspond to observations of $m$-variate mixed vectors. It is assumed that $\mathbf{X}$ is prewhitened, that is, its rows have a sample mean equaling zero and a sample covariance is the $m \times m$ dimensional identity matrix, that is,

$\frac{1}{n}\sum_{j=1}^n x_{ij} = 0 \quad \text{and} \quad \frac{1}{n}\mathbf{X}{\mathbf X}^{\prime} = \mathbf{I}_m$.

Applying JADE to $\mathbf{X}$ entails

1. computing fourth-order cumulants of $\mathbf{X}$ and then
2. optimizing a contrast function to obtain a $m \times m$ rotation matrix $O$

to estimate the source components given by the rows of the $m \times n$ dimensional matrix $\mathbf{Z} := \mathbf{O}^{-1} \mathbf{X}$.
