= Corporate sustainable profitability =

Corporate sustainable profitability (CSP) revolves around the idea that companies who take responsibility from an economical, environmental and social perspective can become more profitable.

== The stairway to CSP ==
Sustainable profitability can be achieved through a stairway with four steps, each step part of a value chain by production, coworkers, customers and brands. Through this process, corporates can gain a larger overall perspective on their business.

That means a new holistic approach where economic, human beings, and the environment are interrelated to make a long-term sustainable profitability. This creates an ambiance of a win-win-situation for all parts that’s involved.

=== Step 1 - The product ===
Raw material for a profitable and sustainable business. The first step towards achieving CSP is to study and analyze the product or the service and see how it can be made more sustainable and profitable. The fundamentals of CSP entail analyzing what the product consists of: components such as working conditions, raw material and environmental impact. The study requires close collaboration with suppliers and allows companies to build a solid foundation in the effort towards a more sustainable profitability.

Environmental measures can result in savings and an increased income. (CSP). Energy efficiency, use of recycled materials, minimizing of material waste, and engaged and healthy employees are direct cost saving actions. As a business it is important to focus on the part of the product or the service process that needs attention and invest with the goal of shaping a more sustainable business.

=== Step 2 - The employees ===
The employees are the ambassadors to maintain sustainable profitability. CSP also addresses how companies can attract motivated and engaged employees that work towards increasing business developments. Young graduates looking for jobs are now evaluating companies for both its CSR values and business environment. Therefore, it is important for companies to strive to become a CSP-oriented company, where the leadership strives for ever-improving agreements, policies and values.

Companies are facing a great challenge to implement CSP in their operations and communicating changes internally and externally. Profitability comes when employees feel more engaged with their work. This in turn leads to better performance and efficiency, an important factor for companies to who want to maintain an increasing level of profitability.

=== Step 3 - The customers ===
The help to sustainable profitability. Customers demand an increasing amount of products and services that are socially and environmentally responsible. This fact emphasizes the skill of learning to listen and respond to consumers' and investors' requirements, both of whom are crucial to the profitability of the company.

We live in a tough business environment where gaining and retaining customers can be difficult. Many companies understand that solid profitability lies in sustainable development, and in order to keep their own CSR values intact, they must consider the implications of working with other companies that do not possess the same values.

=== Step 4 - The brand ===
The brand is a yardstick for sustainable profitability. The fourth step to reach sustainable profitability is to add and communicate the positive values that social- and environmental responsibility brings. Without communicating what companies actually are doing for both society and the environment, stakeholders miss out on the opportunity to make a conscious choice.

Companies can’t rely simply on PR or marketing to boost their brand credibility. The information society we live in today requires both credible and transparent forms of communication, as it increasingly becomes easier for consumers and stakeholders to examine whether a company really lives what it preaches.

== The difference between CSP and CSR ==
An increasing number of companies are realizing the importance of an orderly and active CSR-orientation as socially, environmentally and economically responsible.

It is important both to enhance the brand and to make a difference for people and society. CSP, Corporate sustainable profit probability, is about how companies can make CSR work profitably. If the company sets the CSR-concept in the business strategy, the positive effects will come spontaneously and the CSR course becomes even more sustainable and profitable in the long-run.

== Affärsaktivisten, the book ==
Affärsaktivisten (The business activist), written by Anna Ryott, the former general secretary of the SOS Children Villages in Sweden, is the first book about CSP. Affärsaktivisten is a guide to the new era of probability where sustainability becomes a part of the corporates DNA. The book involves big Swedish business profiles, like Antonia Ax:son Johnson, Micael Dahlén and Alice Bah Kuhnke, that engage in "good business", in both senses of the term.
