= Infomax =

Optimization principle for artificial neural networks

Infomax', or the principle of maximum information preservation, is an optimization principle for artificial neural networks and other information processing systems. It prescribes that a function that maps a set of input values $x$ to a set of output values $z(x)$ should be chosen or learned so as to maximize the average Shannon mutual information between $x$ and $z(x)$, subject to a set of specified constraints and/or noise processes. Infomax algorithms are learning algorithms that perform this optimization process. The principle was described by Linsker in 1988. The objective function is called the InfoMax objective.

As the InfoMax objective is difficult to compute exactly, a related notion uses two models giving two outputs $z_1(x), z_2(x)$, and maximizes the mutual information between these. This contrastive InfoMax objective is a lower bound to the InfoMax objective.

Infomax, in its zero-noise limit, is related to the principle of redundancy reduction proposed for biological sensory processing by Horace Barlow in 1961, and applied quantitatively to retinal processing by Atick and Redlich.

== Applications ==
(Becker and Hinton, 1992) showed that the contrastive InfoMax objective allows a neural network to learn to identify surfaces in random dot stereograms (in one dimension).

One of the applications of infomax has been to an independent component analysis algorithm that finds independent signals by maximizing entropy. Infomax-based ICA was described by (Bell and Sejnowski, 1995), and (Nadal and Parga, 1995).

== See also ==
- FastICA
