= RipX =

Audio software

RipX is audio modification software developed by Hit'n'Mix Ltd. UK and used in entertainment industry. The software is helpful in separating and editing of musical instruments used in audio recordings.

== Company ==
According to the UK government, Neuratron Group was formed in 2004 is having a subsidiary, Hit'n'Mix involved in developing software for source separation and audio editing. The firm has been developing different versions of professional music recognition software and other analysis tools targeted at AI enabled music makers in the world.

Martin Dawe, the programmer innovated first audio files needed in music recognition : PhotoScore, Optical music recognition software that converted images of sheet music into playable music notation, that came out in 1996. Parts of PhotoScore were included with notation software Sibelius. Later, ambitions of doing the same for music recordings – turning recorded notes into midi, brought forth software titles AudioTune (2004) and two years later Audio Score.

The first software offering for the Hit'n'Mix, the eponymous Hit'n'Mix, came to market in 2011, after the developer had spent 10 years creating developing the system. Hit'n'Mix contained the Rip Audio format that RipX still uses.

== Software ==
RipX was initially released as Infinity, around 2019. A continuation of the earlier Hit'n'Mix software, it bore some resemblance to the popular Celemony pitch editing software, particularly DNA Direct Note Access feature that allows users to edit notes from different instruments within an audio recording. Its ability to isolate instruments set it apart from the start, but it came more into its own with the first major update, in 2021, when it was renamed RipX. The first version had relied on algorithmic processing, sinusoidal spectral analysis and resynthesis, but the update added machine learning, and came with drastically improved stem separation capabilities.

As RipX grew it added upgrade modules. The affordable base version, DeepRemix, had stem separation, note editing, pitch/tempo editing and audio editing features like volume, EQ and panning for each instrument. The more expensive DeepAudio added more in-depth sound, pitch and harmony editing features, with product names such as Audioshop, Unpitched Editor, Clone, Draw Audio and others. It also added the RipScripts scripting feature, which was touted as the growth feature. Later the third module, Ripx DeepCreate added some Digital Audio Workstation (DAW)-like features, instrument replacement, audio recording and VST instrument hosting. DeepCreate added a new price point, placed between the affordable DeepRemix and the costlier DeepAudio.

=== RipX DAW ===
In November 2023, the software was relaunched as RipX DAW. At the same time, it switched back to two price tiers.

The upgrade centered on changes making the software into a fully fledged DAW. it added some audio effects, recording and playback improvements, "Integrated AI Music Generator access", various user interface changes and improvements and improvements that they described would affect both sound quality and speed.
