= Critical security parameter =

Cryptography concept

In cryptography, a critical security parameter (CSP) is information that is either user or system defined and is used to operate a cryptography module in processing encryption functions including cryptographic keys and authentication data, such as passwords, the disclosure or modification of which can compromise the security of a cryptographic module or the security of the information protected by the module.
