= Menger =

Menger is a surname. Notable people with the surname include:

- Andreas Menger (born 1972), former German football player
- Anton Menger (1841–1906), Austrian economist and author; brother of Carl Menger
- Carl Menger (1840–1921), Austrian economist and author; founder of the Austrian school of economics
- Howard Menger (1922–2009), American who claimed to have met extraterrestrials
- Karl Menger (1902–1985), Austrian-born mathematician and son of economist Carl Menger
- Kirsten Menger-Anderson (born 1969), American fiction writer
- Rudolph Menger (1851–1921), American naturalist and physician

== See also ==
- Menger Hotel, San Antonio Texas
- Menger sponge, a fractal curve
- Menger's theorem
- Menger–Urysohn dimension; see Inductive dimension
- Cayley–Menger determinant; see Distance geometry
- Manger
