= Georg Nöbeling =

German mathematician

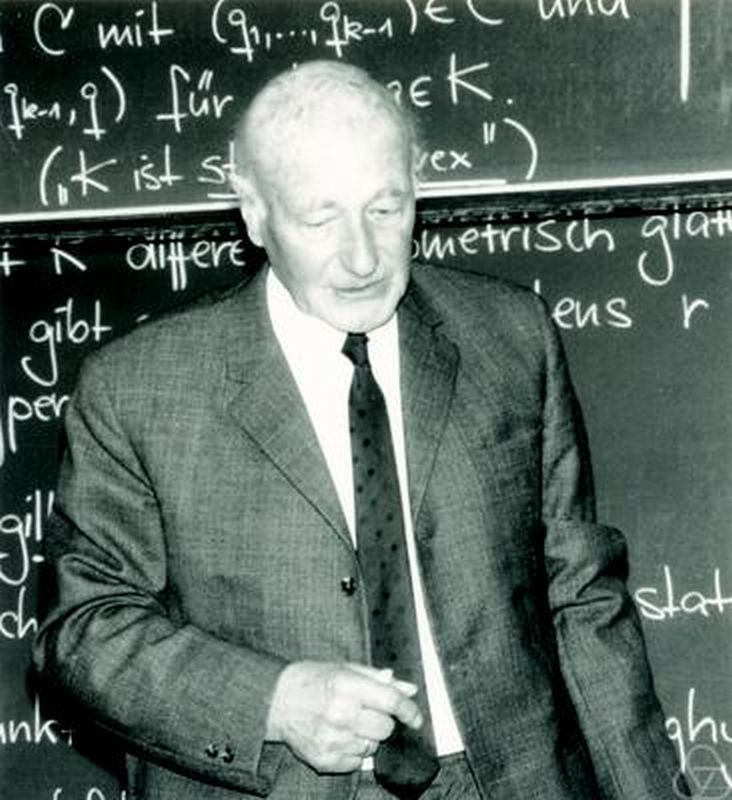
- Georg Nöbeling, Erlangen 1987
- Born: November 12, 1907; Lüdenscheid, Germany
- Died: February 16, 2008 (aged 100); Rosenheim, Germany
- Education: University of Göttingen; University of Vienna
- Scientific career
- Institutions: University of Erlangen–Nuremberg
- Doctoral advisor: Karl Menger
- Other academic advisors: Edmund Landau; Otto Haupt

Georg August Nöbeling (12 November 1907 – 16 February 2008) was a German mathematician.

== Education and career ==
Born and raised in Lüdenscheid, Nöbeling studied mathematics and physics at University of Göttingen between 1927 and 1929 and University of Vienna, where he was a student of Karl Menger and received his PhD in 1931 on a generalization of the embedding theorem, which for one special case can be visualized by the Menger sponge. Nöbeling worked and researched in Menger's Mathematical Colloquium with Kurt Gödel, Franz Alt, Abraham Wald, Olga Taussky-Todd and others.

In 1933, he moved to the University of Erlangen, where he habilitated in 1935 under Otto Haupt and obtained a professorship at the same place in 1940. His work focused on analysis, topology, and geometry. 1968/1969 he solved Specker's theorem on abelian groups.

As Rector (1962–1963) of the University of Erlangen he oversaw the merge with the business college in Nuremberg. He also served twice as the chairman of the German Mathematical Society and is a member of the Bavarian Academy of Sciences and Humanities. He celebrated his 100th birthday in 2007.

== Publications (selected) ==
- Georg Nöbeling: "Über eine n-dimensionale Universalmenge im $\mathbb{R}^{2n+1}$ (on a n-dimensional universal set for metric spaces in $\mathbb{R}^{2n+1}$." Mathematische Annalen 104 (1931), pp. 71–80.
- Georg Nöbeling: "Verallgemeinerung eines Satzes von E. Specker (Generalization of a Theorem by E. Specker)". Inventiones mathematicae 6 (1968), pp. 41–55.

== See also ==
- Inductive dimension
- Universal space
