= The Expert of Subtle Revisions =

2025 novel by Kirsten Menger-Anderson

- Author: Kirsten Menger-Anderson
- Language: English
- Genre: Speculative fiction
- Publisher: Crown Publishing Group
- Publication date: March 18, 2025
- Publication place: United States
- Pages: 256
- ISBN: 978-0593798300

The Expert of Subtle Revisions is the debut novel of Kirsten Menger-Anderson. The book describes itself (on the cover) as "a taut, genre-bending historical mystery."

The 2025 novel blends aspects of the speculative and historical fiction genres.

== Plot ==
The story is told through several different perspectives. Hase is a young woman living in the Bay Area in 2016. Josef and Anton are academics in 1930s Austria. When Hase's father goes missing, she sets out to find him only to be drawn into a historical mystery surrounding the Engelhardt Circle, a group of dissident philosophers and mathematicians in 1930s Austria, and the Zedlacher Institute, whose founder claimed to have met a time traveler affiliated with the Circle as a young man. To solve the mystery, Hase follows clues left behind by her father that are hidden in Wikipedia edits and deleted articles.

== Development history ==
Menger-Anderson was inspired to write the novel by the story of her grandfather, Karl Menger, who was a professor at the University of Vienna who was forced to flee to the United States because of rising antisemitism. The novel's cover mimics the look of a Wikipedia article.

=== Publication history ===
The novel was published in the United States by Crown Publishing Group on March 18, 2025.

== Reception ==
The Expert of Subtle Revisions received positive reception upon release. Kirkus Reviews described the plot as "intricate" and noted the similarities between the novel's "Engelhardt Circle" and the real-life Vienna Circle. Publishers Weekly was similarly positive, praising Menger-Anderson's historical research and describing the novel as "an appealing intellectual mystery." The Los Angeles Times offered praise for the novel's characters and for Menger-Anderson's rendering of the historical political tensions described in the book.

The Straits Times published a positive review praising the book's genre mix, while Historical Novels Review described the novel as "utterly engrossing." The Washington Post recommended the book as one of their "Noteworthy books for March" and the San Francisco Bay Times placed the book on their "Top of Your Stack" recommendations. The novel was selected as one of NPR's 2025 "Books We Love."
