= Hollow matrix =

Several types of mathematical matrix containing zeroes

In mathematics, a hollow matrix may refer to one of several related classes of matrix: a sparse matrix; a matrix with a large block of zeroes; or a matrix with diagonal entries all zero.

== Definitions ==
=== Sparse ===
A hollow matrix may be one with "few" non-zero entries: that is, a sparse matrix.

=== Block of zeroes ===
A hollow matrix may be a square n × n matrix with an r × s block of zeroes where r + s > n.

=== Diagonal entries all zero ===
A hollow matrix may be a square matrix whose diagonal elements are all equal to zero. That is, an n × n matrix A = (a_{ij}) is hollow if a_{ij} = 0 whenever i = j (i.e. a_{ii} = 0 for all i). The most obvious example is the real skew-symmetric matrix. Other examples are the adjacency matrix of a finite simple graph, and a distance matrix or Euclidean distance matrix.

In other words, any square matrix that takes the form
$$\begin{pmatrix}
0   & \ast & & \ast & \ast \\
\ast & 0    & & \ast & \ast \\
& & \ddots \\
\ast & \ast & & 0 & \ast \\
\ast & \ast & & \ast & 0
\end{pmatrix}$$
is a hollow matrix, where the symbol $\ast$ denotes an arbitrary entry.

For example,
$$\begin{pmatrix}
0 & 2 &  6 & \frac{1}{3} & 4 \\
2 & 0 &  4 & 8 & 0 \\
9 & 4 &  0 & 2 & 933 \\
1 & 4 &  4 & 0 & 6 \\
7 & 9 & 23 & 8 & 0
\end{pmatrix}$$
is a hollow matrix.

== Properties ==
- The trace of a hollow matrix is zero.
- If L represents a linear map $L:V \to V$with respect to a fixed basis, then it maps each basis vector e into the complement of the span of e. That is, $L(\langle e \rangle) \cap \langle e \rangle = \langle 0 \rangle$ where $\langle e \rangle = \{ \lambda e : \lambda \in F\}.$
- The Gershgorin circle theorem shows that the moduli of the eigenvalues of a hollow matrix are less or equal to the sum of the moduli of the non-diagonal row entries.
