= Cayley–Menger determinant =

Formula for the "volume" of an n-simplex

In linear algebra, geometry, and trigonometry, the Cayley–Menger determinant is a formula for the content, i.e. the higher-dimensional volume, of an $n$-dimensional simplex in terms of the squares of all the distances between pairs of its vertices. This determinant is named after Arthur Cayley and Karl Menger.

The $n(n+1)/2$ pairwise distance polynomials between $n+1$ points in a (real) Euclidean space are Euclidean invariants that are associated via the Cayley-Menger relations. These relations served multiple purposes, such as generalising Heron's Formula, as well as computing the content of an $n$-dimensional simplex, and ultimately, in the field of distance geometry, determining whether any real symmetric matrix is a Euclidean distance matrix for some $n+1$ points.

== History ==
Karl Menger was a young geometry professor at the University of Vienna and Arthur Cayley was a British mathematician who specialized in algebraic geometry. Menger extended Cayley's algebraic results to propose a new axiom of metric spaces using the concepts of distance geometry up to congruence equivalence, known as the Cayley–Menger determinant. This ended up generalising one of the first discoveries in distance geometry, Heron's formula, which computes the area of a triangle in terms of its side lengths.

== Definition ==
Let $A_0, A_1, \ldots, A_n$ be $n+1$ points in $k$-dimensional Euclidean space, with $k \ge n$. (Note: An $n$-dimensional body can't be immersed into $k$-dimensional space if $k < n$.) These points are the vertices of an $n$-dimensional simplex: a triangle when $n = 2$, a tetrahedron when $n = 3$, and so on. Let $d_{ij}$ be the Euclidean distances between vertices $A_i$ and $A_j$. The content, i.e., the $n$-dimensional volume of this simplex, denoted by $v_n$, can be expressed as a function of $n$ and the determinant of a certain matrix, in two possible ways:

$$\begin{align}
{v_n}^2 & = \frac{1}{(n!)^2 2^n}
\begin{vmatrix}
2d_{01}^2 & d_{01}^2 + d_{02}^2 - d_{12}^2 & \cdots & d_{01}^2 + d_{0n}^2 - d_{1n}^2 \\
d_{01}^2 + d_{02}^2 - d_{12}^2 & 2d_{02}^2 & \cdots & d_{02}^2 + d_{0n}^2 - d_{2n}^2 \\
\vdots & \vdots & \ddots & \vdots \\
d_{01}^2 + d_{0n}^2 - d_{1n}^2 & d_{02}^2 + d_{0n}^2 - d_{2n}^2 & \cdots & 2d_{0n}^2
\end{vmatrix} \\[10pt]
& = \frac{(-1)^{n+1}}{(n!)^2 2^n}
\begin{vmatrix}
0 & d_{01}^2 & d_{02}^2 & \cdots & d_{0n}^2 & 1 \\
d_{01}^2 & 0 & d_{12}^2 & \cdots & d_{1n}^2 & 1 \\
d_{02}^2 & d_{12}^2 & 0 & \cdots & d_{2n}^2 & 1 \\
\vdots & \vdots & \vdots & \ddots & \vdots & \vdots \\
d_{0n}^2 & d_{1n}^2 & d_{2n}^2 & \cdots & 0 & 1 \\
1 & 1 & 1 & \cdots & 1 & 0
\end{vmatrix}.
\end{align}$$

This is the Cayley–Menger determinant. For $n = 2$, we are dealing with a triangle, where swapping edges changes orientation (if orientable), but not area, thus it is necessarily a symmetric polynomial in the $d_{ij}$'s, and invariant under permutation of these quantities. For any larger n-simplex, where $n > 2$, only in special cases will swapping edges be invariant. (Note: The (hyper)volume of a figure does not depend on its vertices' numbering order.) In particular, for $n = 3$, swapping the distances between any pair of skew edges in a sufficiently irregular tetrahedron leads (at best) to a different tetrahedron, with a different determinant; even for the less aggressive case of swapping the distances between any pair of edges that share a vertex, this will flip the orientation of one face (formed by the three vertices of the connected edges), without flipping the orientation of their three connections to the 4th vertex, potentially forming a different tetrahedron, but this mutated object might not even be a viable tetrahedron, in the general case.

The final row and column of $1$'s (and $0$) in the second form of this equation could simultaneously be moved to be the first row and column, giving the same result. Regardless, except for that row and column, the matrix is a Euclidean distance matrix.

The usual formula for the oriented volume of a simplex is $\tfrac1{n!}$ times the determinant of the $n \times n$ matrix composed of the $n$ edge vectors $A_1-A_0, \ldots, A_n-A_0$. Unlike the Cayley–Menger determinant, the latter matrix changes with rotation of the simplex, though not with translation; regardless, its determinant and the resulting volume do not change.

== Special cases ==
To reiterate, an $n$-simplex is an $n$-dimensional polytope and the convex hull of $n+1$ points which do not lie in any $(n-1)$-dimensional plane.

=== $2$-Simplex ===
Hence, a $2$-simplex occurs when $n = 2$ and the simplex results in a triangle. Therefore, the formula for determining ${v_2}^2$ of a triangle is provided below:

$$-16 ~ {v_2}^2 =
\begin{vmatrix}
0 & 1 & 1 & 1\\
1 & 0 & c^2 & b^2\\
1 & c^2 & 0 & a^2\\
1 & b^2 & a^2 & 0\\
\end{vmatrix}.$$

As a result, the equation above presents the content of a $2$-simplex (area of a planar triangle with side lengths $a$, $b$, and $c$) and it is a generalised form of Heron's Formula.

=== $3$-Simplex ===
Similarly, a $3$-simplex occurs when $n = 3$ and the simplex results in a tetrahedron. Therefore, the formula for determining ${v_3}^2$ of a tetrahedron is provided below:

$$288 ~ {v_3}^2 =
\begin{vmatrix}
0 & 1 & 1 & 1 & 1\\
1 & 0 & d_{12}^2 & d_{13}^2 & d_{14}^2\\
1 & d_{21}^2 & 0 & d_{23}^2 & d_{24}^2\\
1 & d_{31}^2 & d_{32}^2 & 0 & d_{34}^2\\
1 & d_{41}^2 & d_{42}^2 & d_{43}^2 & 0\\
\end{vmatrix}.$$

As a result, the equation above presents the content of a $3$-simplex, which is the volume of a tetrahedron where the edge between vertices $i$ and $j$ has length $d_{ij}$.

== Proof ==
Let the column vectors $A_0, A_1, \ldots, A_n$ be $n+1$ points in $n$-dimensional Euclidean space. Starting with the volume formula in terms of an $(n+1) \times (n+1)$ matrix,

$$v_n = \frac{1}{n!} \left| \det \begin{pmatrix}
A_0 & A_1 & \cdots & A_n \\
1  &  1  & \cdots &  1
\end{pmatrix} \right|\,,$$

we note that the determinant is unchanged when we add an extra row and column to make an $(n+2) \times (n+2)$ matrix,

$$P = \begin{pmatrix}
A_0 & A_1 & \cdots & A_n & 0 \\
1  &  1  & \cdots &  1  & 0 \\
\|A_0\|^2 & \|A_1\|^2 & \cdots & \|A_n\|^2 & 1
\end{pmatrix}\,,$$

where $\|A_j\|^2$ is the square of the length of the vector $A_j$. Additionally, we note that the $(n+2) \times (n+2)$ matrix

$$Q = \begin{pmatrix}
-2 & 0 & \cdots & 0 & 0 & 0 \\
0 & -2 & \cdots & 0 & 0 & 0 \\
\vdots & \vdots & \ddots & \vdots & \vdots & \vdots \\
0 & 0 & \cdots & -2 & 0 & 0 \\
0 & 0 & \cdots & 0 & 0 & 1 \\
0 & 0 & \cdots & 0 & 1 & 0
\end{pmatrix}$$

has a determinant of $(-2)^n(-1) = (-1)^{n+1} 2^n$. Thus,

$$\det \begin{pmatrix}
0 & d_{01}^2 & d_{02}^2 & \cdots & d_{0n}^2 & 1 \\
d_{01}^2 & 0 & d_{12}^2 & \cdots & d_{1n}^2 & 1 \\
d_{02}^2 & d_{12}^2 & 0 & \cdots & d_{2n}^2 & 1 \\
\vdots & \vdots & \vdots & \ddots & \vdots & \vdots \\
d_{0n}^2 & d_{1n}^2 & d_{2n}^2 & \cdots & 0 & 1 \\
1 & 1 & 1 & \cdots & 1 & 0
\end{pmatrix}
= \det(P^T Q P) = \det(Q) \det(P)^2 = (-1)^{n+1} 2^n (n!)^2 v_n^2\,.$$

== Examples ==
In the case $n = 2$, $v_2$ is the area of a triangle and thus we will denote this by $A$. By the Cayley–Menger determinant, where the triangle has side lengths $a$, $b$, and $c$,

$$\begin{align}
16 A^2 &= \begin{vmatrix} 2a^2 & a^2+b^2-c^2 \\ a^2+b^2-c^2 & 2b^2 \end{vmatrix} \\[8pt]
&= 4a^2b^2 - (a^2+b^2-c^2)^2 \\[6pt]
&= (a^2+b^2+c^2)^2 - 2(a^4+b^4+c^4) \\[6pt]
&= (a+b+c)(a+b-c)(a-b+c)(-a+b+c).
\end{align}$$

The result in the third line is due to the Fibonacci identity. The final line can be rewritten to obtain Heron's formula for the area of a triangle given its three sides, which was known to Archimedes prior.

In the case $n=3$, the quantity $v_3$ gives the volume of a tetrahedron, which we will denote by $V$. For distances between $A_i$ and $A_j$ denoted by $d_{ij}$, the Cayley–Menger determinant gives

$$\begin{align}
144 V^2 = {} & \frac{1}{2}
\begin{vmatrix}
2d_{01}^2 & d_{01}^2+d_{02}^2-d_{12}^2 & d_{01}^2+d_{03}^2-d_{13}^2 \\
d_{01}^2+d_{02}^2-d_{12}^2 & 2d_{02}^2 & d_{02}^2+d_{03}^2-d_{23}^2 \\
d_{01}^2+d_{03}^2-d_{13}^2 & d_{02}^2+d_{03}^2-d_{23}^2 & 2d_{03}^2
\end{vmatrix} \\[8pt]
= {} & 4d_{01}^2 d_{02}^2 d_{03}^2 + (d_{01}^2+d_{02}^2-d_{12}^2)(d_{01}^2+d_{03}^2-d_{13}^2)(d_{02}^2+d_{03}^2-d_{23}^2) \\[6pt]
& {} -d_{01}^2(d_{02}^2+d_{03}^2-d_{23}^2)^2 - d_{02}^2(d_{01}^2+d_{03}^2-d_{13}^2)^2 - d_{03}^2(d_{01}^2+d_{02}^2-d_{12}^2)^2.
\end{align}$$

=== Finding the circumradius of a simplex ===
Given a nondegenerate $n$-simplex, it has a circumscribed $n$-sphere, with radius $r$. Then the $(n+1)$-simplex made of the vertices of the $n$-simplex and the center of the $n$-sphere is degenerate. Thus, we have

$$\begin{vmatrix}
0 & r^2 & r^2 & r^2 & \cdots & r^2  & 1 \\
r^2 & 0 & d_{01}^2 & d_{02}^2 & \cdots & d_{0n}^2 & 1 \\
r^2 & d_{01}^2 & 0 & d_{12}^2 & \cdots & d_{1n}^2 & 1 \\
r^2 & d_{02}^2 & d_{12}^2 & 0 & \cdots & d_{2n}^2 & 1 \\
\vdots & \vdots & \vdots & \vdots & \ddots & \vdots & \vdots \\
r^2 & d_{0n}^2 & d_{1n}^2 & d_{2n}^2 & \cdots & 0 & 1 \\
1 & 1 & 1 & 1 & \cdots & 1 & 0
\end{vmatrix} = 0\,.$$

Using
$$\begin{vmatrix}A & B \\ C & D\end{vmatrix} = \begin{vmatrix}D\end{vmatrix} \begin{vmatrix}A - B D^{-1} C\end{vmatrix}$$,
$$\begin{vmatrix}D\end{vmatrix} \ne 0$$
, and
$$A = \left(\begin{matrix}0\end{matrix}\right)$$
, this is equivalent to

$$\left( \begin{matrix} r^2 & r^2 & r^2 & \cdots & r^2 & 1 \end{matrix} \right)
\left( \begin{matrix}
0 & d_{01}^2 & d_{02}^2 & \cdots & d_{0n}^2 & 1 \\
d_{01}^2 & 0 & d_{12}^2 & \cdots & d_{1n}^2 & 1 \\
d_{02}^2 & d_{12}^2 & 0 & \cdots & d_{2n}^2 & 1 \\
\vdots & \vdots & \vdots & \ddots & \vdots & \vdots \\
d_{0n}^2 & d_{1n}^2 & d_{2n}^2 & \cdots & 0 & 1 \\
1 & 1 & 1 & \cdots & 1 & 0
\end{matrix} \right)^{-1}
\left( \begin{matrix} r^2 \\ r^2 \\ r^2 \\ \vdots \\ r^2 \\ 1 \end{matrix} \right)
= 0\,,$$
which is a quadratic equation for $r^2$. Solving for $r$, we get

$$r = \left( 2
\left( \begin{matrix} 1 & 1 & 1 & \cdots & 1 \end{matrix} \right)
\left( \begin{matrix}
0 & d_{01}^2 & d_{02}^2 & \cdots & d_{0n}^2 \\
d_{01}^2 & 0 & d_{12}^2 & \cdots & d_{1n}^2 \\
d_{02}^2 & d_{12}^2 & 0 & \cdots & d_{2n}^2 \\
\vdots & \vdots & \vdots & \ddots & \vdots \\
d_{0n}^2 & d_{1n}^2 & d_{2n}^2 & \cdots & 0
\end{matrix} \right)^{-1}
\left( \begin{matrix} 1 \\ 1 \\ 1 \\ \vdots \\ 1 \end{matrix} \right)
\right)^{-1/2}
\,.$$

For example, when $n = 2$, this gives the circumradius of a triangle in terms of its edge lengths.

== Set Classifications ==
From these determinants, we also have the following classifications:

=== Straight ===
A set Λ (with at least three distinct elements) is called straight if and only if, for any three elements A, B, and C of Λ,

$$\det \begin{bmatrix}
0 & d(AB)^2 & d(AC)^2 & 1 \\
d(AB)^2 &    0    & d(BC)^2 & 1 \\
d(AC)^2 & d(BC)^2 &       0 & 1 \\
1 &       1 &       1 & 0
\end{bmatrix} = 0$$

=== Plane ===
A set Π (with at least four distinct elements) is called plane if and only if, for any four elements A, B, C and D of Π,

$$\det \begin{bmatrix}
0 & d(AB)^2 & d(AC)^2 & d(AD)^2 & 1 \\
d(AB)^2 &    0    & d(BC)^2 & d(BD)^2 & 1 \\
d(AC)^2 & d(BC)^2 &       0 & d(CD)^2 & 1 \\
d(AD)^2 & d(BD)^2 & d(CD)^2 &       0 & 1 \\
1 &       1 &       1 & 1       & 0
\end{bmatrix} = 0$$

but not all triples of elements of Π are straight to each other;

=== Flat ===
A set Φ (with at least five distinct elements) is called flat if and only if, for any five elements A, B, C, D and E of Φ,

$$\det \begin{bmatrix}
0 & d(AB)^2 & d(AC)^2 & d(AD)^2 & d(AE)^2 & 1 \\
d(AB)^2 &    0    & d(BC)^2 & d(BD)^2 & d(BE)^2 & 1 \\
d(AC)^2 & d(BC)^2 &       0 & d(CD)^2 & d(CE)^2 & 1 \\
d(AD)^2 & d(BD)^2 & d(CD)^2 &       0 & d(DE)^2 & 1 \\
d(AE)^2 & d(BE)^2 & d(CE)^2 & d(DE)^2 &       0 & 1 \\
1 &       1 &       1 & 1       &       1 & 0
\end{bmatrix} = 0$$

but not all quadruples of elements of Φ are plane to each other; and so on.

== Menger's Theorem ==
Karl Menger made a further discovery after the development of the Cayley–Menger determinant, which became known as Menger's theorem (unrelated to the theorem of that name in graph theory). The theorem states:

For a finite set of points $A$, a semi-metric $\rho: A \times A \rightarrow \mathbb{R}_{\geq0}$ can be obtained from a Euclidean metric of dimension n if and only if every Cayley-Menger determinant on $n+1$ points is strictly positive, every determinant on $n+2$ points vanishes, and a Cayley-Menger determinant on at least one set of $n+3$ points is nonnegative (in which case it is necessarily zero).

In simpler terms, if every subset of $n+2$ points can be isometrically embedded in an $n$-dimensional, but not generally $(n-1)$-dimensional Euclidean space, then the semi-metric is Euclidean of dimension $n$ unless $A$ consists of exactly $n+3$ points and the Cayley–Menger determinant on those $n+3$ points is strictly negative. This type of semi-metric would be classified as pseudo-Euclidean.

== Realization of a Euclidean distance matrix ==
Given the Cayley-Menger relations as explained above, the following section will bring forth two algorithms to decide whether a given matrix is a distance matrix corresponding to a Euclidean point set. The first algorithm will do so when given a matrix AND the dimension, $d$, via a geometric constraint solving algorithm. The second algorithm does so when the dimension, $d$, is not provided. This algorithm theoretically finds a realization of the full $n \times n$ Euclidean distance matrix in the smallest possible embedding dimension in quadratic time.

=== Theorem (d is given) ===
For the sake and context of the following theorem, algorithm, and example, slightly different notation will be used than before resulting in an altered formula for the volume of the $n-1$ dimensional simplex below than above.

Theorem. An $n \times n$ matrix $\Delta$ is a Euclidean Distance Matrix if and only if for all $k \times k$ submatrices $S$ of $\Delta$, where $k \leq n$, $\det (\hat{\delta _S}) \geq 0$. For $\Delta$ to have a realization in dimension $d$, if $|S| = k \geq d + 2$, then $\det (\hat{\delta _S}) = 0$.

As stated before, the purpose to this theorem comes from the following algorithm for realizing a Euclidean Distance Matrix or a Gramian Matrix.

==== Algorithm ====
Input
Euclidean Distance Matrix $\Delta$ or Gramian Matrix $\Gamma$.

Output
Pointset $P$

Procedure

- If the dimension $d$ is fixed, we can solve a system of polynomial equations, one for each inner product entry of $\Gamma$, where the variables are the coordinates of each point $p_1, \ldots, p_n$ in the desired dimension $d$.
- Otherwise, we can solve for one point at a time.
  - Solve for the coordinates of $p_k$ using its distances to all previously placed points $p_1, \ldots, p_{k-1}$. Thus, $p_k$ is represented by at most $k - 1$ coordinate values, ensuring minimum dimension and complexity.

==== Example ====
Let each point $p_k$ have coordinates ${p^1_k, p^2_k, \ldots}$. To place the first three points:

1. Put $p_1$ at the origin, so $p_1 = {0,0,\ldots}$.
2. Put $p_2$ on the first axis, so $p_2 = {(\delta_{12})^2, 0, \ldots}$.
3. To place $p_3$:

$$\begin{cases}
(p^1_1 - p^1_3)^2 + (p^2_1 - p^2_3)^2 = (\delta_{13})^2\\
(p^1_2 - p^1_3)^2 + (p^2_2 - p^2_3)^2 = (\delta_{23})^2
\end{cases}$$
$$\rightarrow
\begin{cases}
p^1_3 = \frac{(\delta_{12})^2 + (\delta_{13})^2 - (\delta_{23})^2}{2 \delta_{12}}\\
p^2_3 = \frac{\sqrt{(\delta_{31} + \delta_{32} + \delta_{12})(\delta_{31} + \delta_{32} - \delta_{12})(\delta_{31} - \delta_{32} + \delta_{12})(- \delta_{31} + \delta_{32} + \delta_{12})}}{2 \delta_{01}}
\end{cases}$$

In order to find a realization using the above algorithm, the discriminant of the distance quadratic system must be positive, which is equivalent to $\Delta p_1p_2p_3$ having positive volume. In general, the volume of the $n-1$ dimensional simplex formed by the $n$ vertices is given by

$$V^{2}_{n-1} = \frac{(-1)^{n}}{2^{n-1} (n-1!)^{2}} \det (\hat{\Delta}) .$$

In this formula above, $\det (\hat{\Delta})$ is the Cayley–Menger determinant. This volume being positive is equivalent to the determinant of the volume matrix being positive.

=== Theorem (d not given) ===
Let K be a positive integer and D be a 1n × n symmetric hollow matrix with nonnegative elements, with n ≥ 2. D is a Euclidean distance matrix with dim(D) = K if and only if there exist $\{x_i\}_{i=1}^n \subseteq \mathbb{R}^K$ and an index set I =$\{i_1,\ldots,i_{K+1}\} \subseteq I_n$ such that

$$\begin{cases}
x_i = 0 \\
x_{i_j} (j -1) \ne 0,  & \mbox{ }  j \in I_{2,K+1} \\
x_{i_j} (i) = 0,  & \mbox{ }  j \in I_{2,K}, i \in I_{j,K},
\end{cases}$$

where $\{x_i\}_{i=1}^n$ realizes D, where $x_h(l)$ denotes the $l^{th}$ component of the $h^{th}$ vector.

The extensive proof of this theorem can be found at the following reference.

=== Algorithm - K = edmsph(D, x) ===
$I = \{1,2\}$ $K = 1$ $(x_1, x_2) = (0, \sqrt{D_{12}})$ $\text{for i} \in \{3,\ldots,n\}\text{ do}$

Γ $= \bigcap_{j \in I} S^K(x_j, D_{ij})$
if Γ $=$ ∅; then

return ∞

else if Γ $= \{p_i\} \text{ } then$

$$x_i = p_i$$

else if Γ$= \{p_i^+, p_i^-\} \text{ } then$

$$x_i = p_i^+$$
$x$ ← expand($x$)
I ← I ∪ {i}
K ← K + 1

else

error: dim aff(span(x_{j})) < K - 1

end if

end for return K

== See also ==
- Distance geometry
- Euclidean space
- Euclidean distance matrix
- Simplex
- Heron's formula
