= Inductive dimension =

Invariant of topological spaces

In the mathematical field of topology, the inductive dimension of a topological space X is either of two values, the small inductive dimension ind(X) or the large inductive dimension Ind(X). These are based on the observation that, in n-dimensional Euclidean space R^{n}, the boundaries of balls have dimension n − 1. Therefore it should be possible to define the dimension of a general space inductively in terms of the dimensions of the boundaries of suitable open sets in that space.

The small and large inductive dimensions are two of the three most usual ways of capturing the notion of "dimension" for a topological space, in a way that depends only on the topology (and not, say, on the properties of a metric space). The other is the Lebesgue covering dimension. The term "topological dimension" is ordinarily understood to refer to the Lebesgue covering dimension. For "sufficiently nice" spaces, the three measures of dimension are equal.

== Formal definitions ==
We want the dimension of a point to be 0, and a point has empty boundary, so we start with

$$\operatorname{ind}(\varnothing)=\operatorname{Ind}(\varnothing)=-1.$$

Then inductively, ind(X) is the smallest natural number n with the following property: for every $x \isin X$ and every open set U containing x, there is an open set V that contains x and whose closure is contained in U, such that the boundary of V has small inductive dimension less than n. Here, the boundary of V is considered as a topological space using the subspace topology inherited from X. (In the case of subspaces of Euclidean space, we may think of the sets V as tiny balls centered at x.) If no such n exists, we write ind(X) = ∞.

The large inductive dimension Ind(X) is defined to be the smallest n such that, for every closed subset F and every open subset U containing F, there is an open V that contains F and whose closure is contained in U, such that the boundary of V has large inductive dimension less than n. If no such n exists, we write Ind(X) = ∞.

== Examples ==
For nice and tame spaces, the inductive dimensions yield the expected answer. Consider for instance the set

$$X=\{(x,y,0) \mid x^2+y^2\leq 1\} \cup \{(0,0,z)\mid 0\leq z < 1\}\cup \{(0,0,-1)\}$$

with the topology inherited from Euclidean space R^{3}. Intuitively, X consists of a 2-dimensional piece attached to a 1-dimensional piece, together with a disjoint 0-dimensional point. Both large and small inductive dimensions of X turn out to be 2.

Maybe less expected is $\operatorname{ind} \Q = \operatorname{Ind} \Q = 0.$ This holds because for irrational numbers a and b, the set $\{r\in\Q\mid a<r<b\}$ is both open and closed in $\Q$ and therefore has empty boundary.

== Relationships between dimensions ==
Let $\dim$ be the Lebesgue covering dimension. For any topological space X, we have

$\dim X = 0$ if and only if $\operatorname{Ind} X = 0.$

Urysohn's theorem states that when X is a normal space with a countable base, then

$$\dim X = \operatorname{Ind} X = \operatorname{ind} X.$$

Such spaces are exactly the separable and metrizable spaces (see Urysohn's metrization theorem).

The Nöbeling–Pontryagin theorem then states that such spaces with finite dimension are characterised up to homeomorphism as the subspaces of the Euclidean spaces, with their usual topology. The Menger–Nöbeling theorem (1932) states that if $X$ is compact metric separable and of dimension $n$, then it embeds as a subspace of Euclidean space of dimension $2 n + 1$. (Georg Nöbeling was a student of Karl Menger. He introduced Nöbeling space, the subspace of $\mathbf{R}^{2 n + 1}$ consisting of points with at least $n + 1$ co-ordinates being irrational numbers, which has universal properties for embedding spaces of dimension $n$.)

Assuming only X metrizable we have (Miroslav Katětov)

ind X ≤ Ind X = dim X;

or assuming X compact and Hausdorff (P. S. Aleksandrov)

dim X ≤ ind X ≤ Ind X.

Either inequality here may be strict; an example of Vladimir V. Filippov shows that the two inductive dimensions may differ.

A separable metric space X satisfies the inequality $\operatorname{Ind}X\le n$ if and only if for every closed sub-space $A$ of the space $X$ and each continuous mapping $f:A\to S^n$ there exists a continuous extension $\bar f:X\to S^n$.
