= Rudolph Menger =

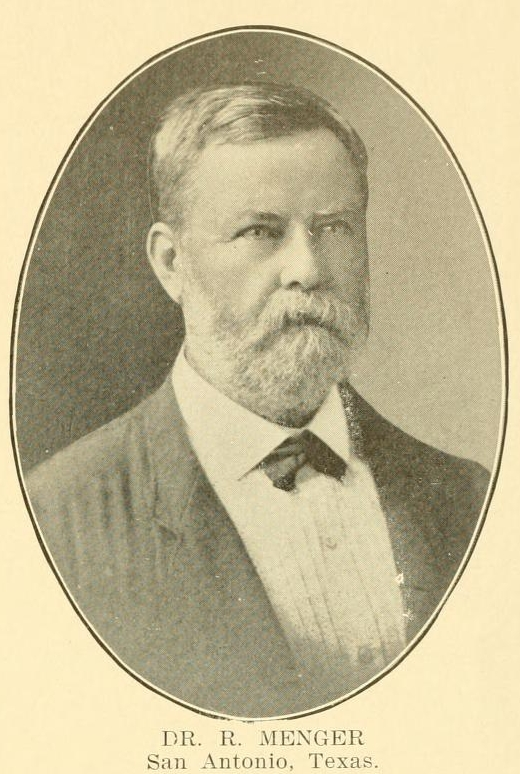
Dr Menger around 1911

Rudolph Menger (21 April 1851 – 16 March 1921) was an American physician and naturalist who worked as a city physician in San Antonio, Texas. His observations of the natural history of the region were published in Texas Nature Observations and Reminiscenses (1913).

Menger was born in San Antonio, Texas, the son of German immigrants Simon L. and Augusta Louisa Menger (born Schoeniger). He went to the German school and worked as a clerk at Kalteyer’s Drug Store from 1866 to 1869 where he began to learn pharmacy. He went to the University of Leipzig and graduated in medicine in 1874. He then worked at San Antonio as an assistant surgeon in the US army after which he served as city physician (1875-1881, 1892). He also had a private practice and was a member of the West Texas Medical Society. He published medical notes and also took an interest in the local natural history. He was the first to perform a suprapubic lithotomy in the US in 1886. He published his natural history observations in 1913 in Texas Nature Observations and Reminiscenses.

Menger married Barbara C. Menger, daughter of an unrelated William L. Menger who owned Menger Hotel, in 1879. They had eight children.
