= Karl Menger =

Austrian–American mathematician

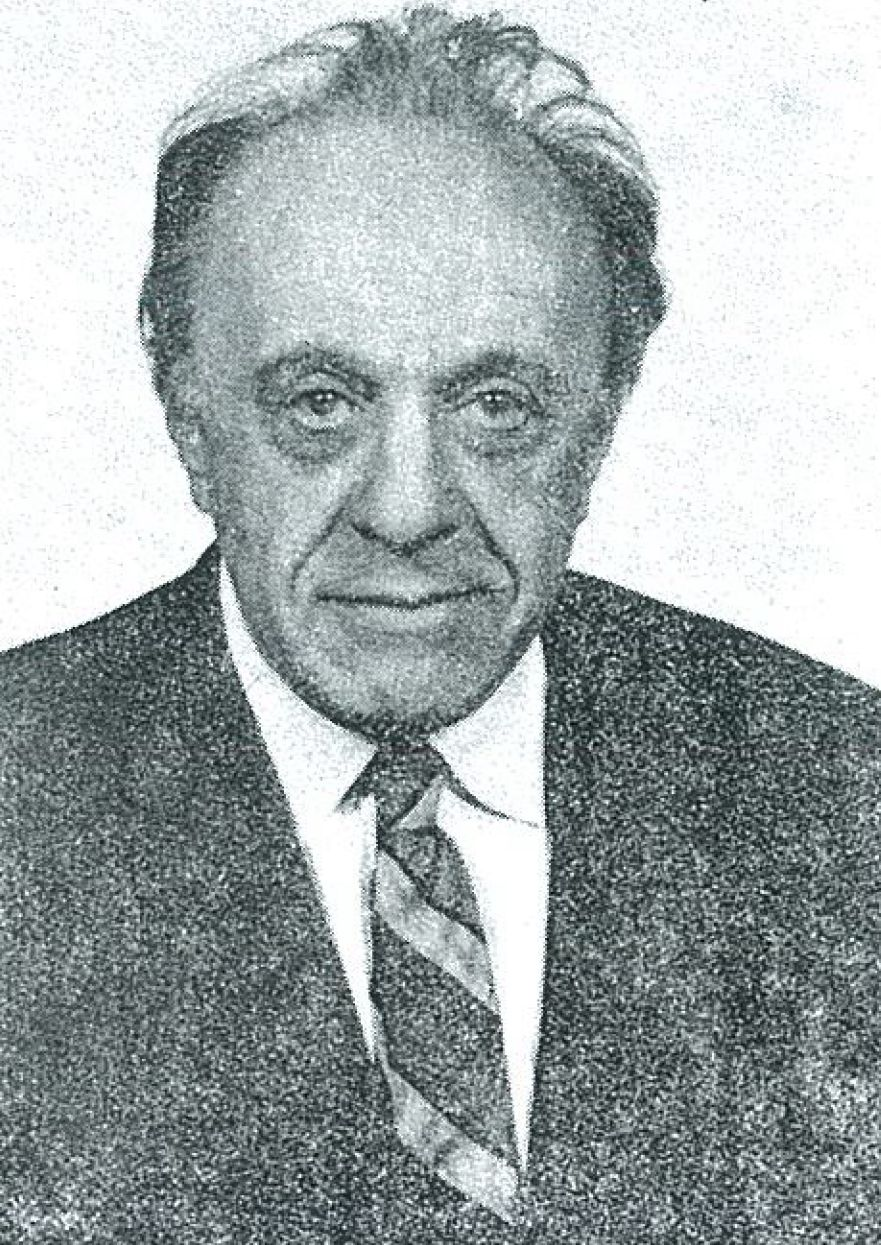
- Born: January 13, 1902; Vienna, Austria-Hungary
- Died: October 5, 1985 (aged 83); Highland Park, Illinois, U.S.
- Education: University of Vienna (PhD, 1924)
- Known for: Menger characterization theorem Menger curvature Menger space Menger sponge Menger's theorem Menger–Nöbeling theorem Cayley–Menger determinant
- Scientific career
- Fields: Mathematics
- Workplaces: Illinois Institute of Technology; University of Notre Dame; University of Vienna
- Thesis: Über die Dimensionalität von Punktmengen (1924)
- Doctoral advisor: Hans Hahn
- Doctoral students: Witold HurewiczGeorg Nöbeling; Abraham Wald
- Other notable students: Arthur Fine; Kurt Gödel

Karl Menger (German: [ˈmɛŋɐ]; January 13, 1902 – October 5, 1985) was an Austrian-born American mathematician, the son of the economist Carl Menger. In mathematics, Menger studied the theory of algebras and the dimension theory of low-regularity ("rough") curves and regions; as well as topology. In graph theory, he is credited with Menger's theorem. Outside of mathematics, Menger has substantial contributions to game theory and social sciences.

== Biography ==
Karl Menger was a student of Hans Hahn and received his PhD from the University of Vienna in 1924. L. E. J. Brouwer invited Menger in 1925 to teach at the University of Amsterdam. In 1927, he returned to Vienna to accept a professorship there. In 1930 and 1931 he was visiting lecturer at Harvard University and the Rice Institute. From 1937 to 1946 he was a professor at the University of Notre Dame. From 1946 to 1971, he was a professor at Illinois Institute of Technology (IIT) in Chicago. In 1983, IIT awarded Menger a Doctor of Humane Letters and Sciences degree.

== Contributions to mathematics ==
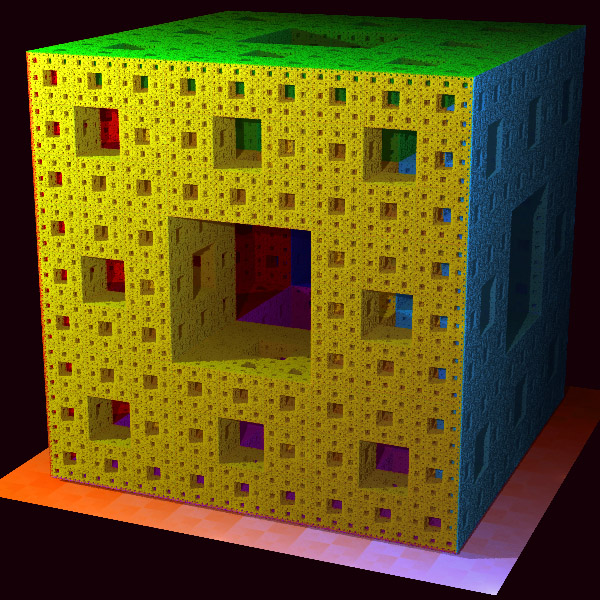
Computer illustration of the "Menger sponge"

His most famous popular contribution was the Menger sponge (mistakenly known as Sierpinski's sponge), a three-dimensional version of the Sierpiński carpet. It is also related to the Cantor set.

With Arthur Cayley, Menger is considered one of the founders of distance geometry; especially by having formalized definitions of the notions of angle and of curvature in terms of directly measurable physical quantities, namely ratios of distance values. The characteristic mathematical expressions appearing in those definitions are Cayley–Menger determinants.

He was an active participant of the Vienna Circle, which had discussions in the 1920s on social science and philosophy. During that time, he published an influential result on the St. Petersburg paradox with applications to the utility theory in economics; this result has since been criticised as fundamentally misleading. Later he contributed to the development of game theory with Oskar Morgenstern.

Menger's work on topology without points followed Whitehead's point-free geometry's approach and used shrinking regions of the plane to simulate points.

Menger was a founding member of the Econometric Society.

== Legacy ==
Menger's longest and last academic post was at the Illinois Institute of Technology, which hosts an annual IIT Karl Menger Lecture and offers the IIT Karl Menger Student Award to an exceptional student for scholarship each year.

Menger's memoirs inspired his granddaughter Kirsten Menger-Anderson to write the 2025 novel The Expert of Subtle Revisions, which featured a fictionalized Vienna Circle.

== See also ==
- Distance geometry
- Kuratowski's theorem
- Selection principle
- Travelling salesman problem
