= Kirsten Menger-Anderson =

American fiction writer (born 1969)

- Born: December 6, 1969 (age 56); Santa Cruz, California, U.S.
- Education: Haverford College; San Francisco State University (MA)
- Occupation: Writer
- Relatives: Karl Menger (grandfather)
- Writing career
- Genre: Fiction
- Website: www.kirstenmengeranderson.com

Kirsten Menger-Anderson (born December 6, 1969, in Santa Cruz, California) is an American fiction writer. Her latest work and debut novel is The Expert of Subtle Revisions, which was published by Penguin Random House and releases March 18, 2025. Her first book, a collection of linked short stories titled Doctor Olaf van Schuler's Brain, was published by Algonquin Books in 2008. A number of the collected stories have also appeared in literary journals, such as Ploughshares and the Southwest Review. Menger-Anderson has a degree in Economics from Haverford College and an MA in English and creative writing from San Francisco State University. She previously held positions at Salon.com and Wired.com. Menger-Anderson currently lives in an old Victorian house in San Francisco with her husband and children. Her grandfather is the mathematician Karl Menger.

== Publications ==
- The Expert of Subtle Revisions, a novel, Penguin Random House, March, 2025 ISBN 978-0-59379-830-0
- Doctor Olaf van Schuler’s Brain, a collection of linked short stories, Algonquin, September, 2008 ISBN 978-1-56512-561-2
- Salk and Sabin, a short story, Ploughshares, Issue #106 Vol. 34/2&3 Fall 2008
- The Doctors, a short story, Post Road, Issue 16 Fall/Winter 2008 ISBN 0-9778552-4-4
- The Baquet, a short story, Southwest Review, Volume 89, Number 2 & 3, 2004
- Reading Grandpa’s Head, a short story, Maryland Review, Volume 1 Fall 2004
- The Story of Her Breasts, a short story, Plaztik Press, 2004
- Kathleen, a short story, Pindeldyboz, 2003
- Blue Glow, a short story, Lynx Eye, Volume X Number 4 Fall 2003
- Gretle, a short story, Wascana Review, Volume 36, Number 2 Fall, 2001

== Critical acclaim ==
Doctor Olaf van Schuler's Brain was a finalist for the Northern California Book Award. It was selected as one of 2008’s best books by the Sun Sentinel Books editor, Chauncey Mabe and was included in Chicago Time Out’s “Top 10 for 2008” as well as SEED Magazine’s top picks for 2008. Several of her short stories have been short-listed for awards, including the Richard Yates Award, the Glimmer Train Short Story Award for New Writers, the Iowa Review Story Contest, and the Andre Dubus Award. Her novel The Expert of Subtle Revisions received positive reviews from Kirkus Reviews , the Los Angeles Times , and the Washington Post .
