= Protecode =

Canadian software company

- Industry: Open Source License Management, application lifecycle management, computer software
- Founded: Ontario, Canada (2006)
- Headquarters: Kanata, Ontario, Canada
- Key people: Mahshad Koohgoli; (President and Chief Executive Officer); Kia Mousavi; (Co-founder and Chief Technology Officer); Hassib Khanafer; (Chief Technology Officer)
- Products: Protecode Enterprise: Enterprise Analyzer; Code Administrator; Developer Assistant; Library Auditor; Build Analyzer; Protecode Compact
- Services: Audit Services
- Parent: Synopsys
- Website: www.protecode.com

Protecode was a private company founded in 2006 and based in Ottawa, Ontario, Canada that provided open source license and security management software used for software development license compliance.

It was acquired by Synopsys in November 2015 for undisclosed terms. Protecode is now known as Black Duck Binary Analysis.

== Products ==
Protecode Enterprise System is a suite of tools for managing open source software licensing. Protecode utilizes a proprietary database of indexed public open source projects to compare against a software codebase in order to identify open source components and determine license obligations.

The Protecode product suite produces a software inventory report, cross-referenced to licensing and copyright attributes, to indicate corresponding licensing obligations.

In 2013, Protecode announced a single seat open source management scanning tool.

== Services ==
Protecode offers code auditing services to detect all open source and third party and associated licensing obligations before a product release or mergers and acquisitions.

== Partnerships ==
Protecode is a member of IBM Partnerworld and System 4 received validation from IBM Rational Software for IBM Rational Team Concert and IBM Rational ClearCase.

Protecode is available on IBM SmartCloud.

Protecode Library Auditor integrates with Perforce.

Protecode is a member of the Linux Foundation and a contributor to their Open Compliance Program. Protecode is also a supporter of the Linux Foundation sponsored SPDX specification.

Protecode is a member of the Eclipse Foundation and the GENIVI Alliance

== Recognition ==
- In May 2010, Protecode was included in the “Cool Vendors in Intellectual Property, 2010” report by Gartner, Inc.
- In 2009, The Branham Group included Protecode on its list of the Top 25 Canadian IT Up and Comers

== See also ==
- List of companies of Canada
- Google Code Search
- Koders
- Krugle
- Open Hub
