= RE2 =

RE2 may refer to:

- RE2 (software), a regular expression software library
- Resident Evil 2, a 1998 survival horror video game
  - Resident Evil 2 (2019 video game), a 2019 remake of the 1998 video game
- Resident Evil: Apocalypse, a 2004 horror film, second in the film franchise
- Boulder Valley School District (or district Re2), in Boulder, Colorado
- Texas Recreational Road 2 (or RE2), Texas RE2 in Val Verde County
- Rhein-Haard-Express (RE 2), German train service

== See also ==
- Resident Evil 2 (disambiguation)
