= Google Code Search =

Beta product from Google

- Website type: Search engine
- Available in: All languages
- Owner: Google
- Website: www.google.com/codesearch
- Launched: October 5, 2006; 19 years ago
- Current status: Discontinued as of 15 January 2012

Google Code Search was a free beta product from Google which debuted in Google Labs on October 5, 2006, allowing web users to search for open-source code on the Internet. Features included the ability to search using operators, namely lang:, package:, license:, and file:.

The code available for searching was in various formats including tar.gz, .tar.bz2, .tar, and .zip, CVS, Subversion, git and Mercurial repositories.

Google Code Search covered many open-source projects, and as such is different from the "Code Search for Google Open source projects" that was released afterwards.

== Regular expression engine ==
The site allowed the use of regular expressions in queries, which at that time was not offered by any other search engine for code. This makes it resemble grep, but over the world's public code. The methodology employed, sometimes called trigram search, combines a trigram index with a custom-built, denial-of-service resistant regular expression engine.

In March 2010, the code of RE2, the regular expression engine used in Google Code Search, was made open source.

Google Code Search supported POSIX extended regular expression syntax, excluding back-references, collating elements, and collation classes.

Languages not officially supported could be searched for using the file: operator to match the common file extensions for the language.

== Discontinuation ==
In October 2011, Google announced that Code Search was to be shut down along with the Code Search API. The service remained online until March 2013, and it now returns a 404.

In January 2012, Google developer Russ Cox published an overview of history and the technical aspects of the tool, and open-sourced a basic implementation of a similar functionality as a set of standalone programs that can run fast indexed regular expression searches over local code.

== See also ==
- Krugle
- Open Hub (a merge of Ohloh and Koders)
- Merobase
- OpenGrok
- Trigram search
