= Comparison of regular expression engines =

This is a comparison of regular expression engines.

== Libraries ==
List of regular expression libraries
Name	Official website	Programming language	Software license	Used by
Boost.Regex (Note: Formerly called Regex++.)	Boost C++ Libraries	C++	Boost	Notepad++ >= 6.0.0, EmEditor
Boost.Xpressive	Boost C++ Libraries	C++	Boost	
DEELX	RegExLab	C++	Proprietary	
FREJ (Note: One of fuzzy regular expression engines.)	Fuzzy Regular Expressions for Java	Java	LGPL	
GLib/GRegex (Note: Included since version 2.13.0.)	GLib reference manual	C	LGPL	
GNU regex	Gnulib reference manual	C	LGPL	GNU libc, GNU programs
GRETA	Microsoft Research	C++	Proprietary	
Gregex	Grovf Inc.	RTL, HLS	Proprietary	FPGA accelerated >100 Gbit/s regex engine for cybersecurity, financial, e-commerce industries.
Hyperscan	Intel	C, x86-specific assembly (SSSE3+)	3-clause BSD	Rspamd
ICU	International Components for Unicode	C, C++ (Note: ICU4J, the Java version, does not support regular expressions.)	ICU	Foundation (Apple and Swift open-source versions)
Irregexp	Irregexp	C++	3-clause BSD	Chrome, Firefox, Node.js
Jakarta Regexp	The Apache Jakarta Project	Java	Apache	
java.util.regex	Java's User manual	Java	GNU GPLv2 with Classpath exception	jEdit
JRegex	JRegex	Java	BSD	
MATLAB	Regular Expressions	MATLAB Language	Proprietary	
Oniguruma	Kosako	C	BSD	Atom, Take Command Console, Tera Term, TextMate, Sublime Text, SubEthaEdit, EmEditor, jq, Ruby
Java port of Oniguruma	joni	Java	MIT	JRuby, Nashorn (JavaScript engine)
Pattwo	Stevesoft	Java (compatible with Java 1.0)	LGPL	
PCRE	pcre.org	C, C++ (Note: C++ bindings were developed by Google and became officially part of PCRE in 2006.)	BSD	Apache HTTP Server, Nginx, BBEdit, Edbrowse, Julia, HHVM, Notepad++ < 6.0.0, PHP, Delphi, R, Exim, SWI-Prolog, Elixir, Erlang
Qt/QRegExp	Digia	C++	Qt GNU GPL v. 3.0, Qt GNU LGPL v. 2.1, Qt Commercial	Kate, Kile
regex - Henry Spencer's regular expression libraries	ArgList	C	BSD	
RE2	RE2	C++	BSD	Go, Google Sheets, Gmail, G Suite
Regex+	slevithan/regex on GitHub	JavaScript	MIT	
Henry Spencer's Advanced Regular Expressions	Tcl	C	BSD	
RGX	RGX	C++ based component library	P6R	
RXP	Titan IC	RTL	Proprietary	hardware-accelerated search acceleration using RegEx available for ASIC, FPGA and cloud. Enables massively parallel content processing at ultra-high speeds.
SubReg	Matt Bucknall	C	MIT	
TPerlRegEx	TPerlRegEx VCL Component	Object Pascal	MPLv1.1	
TRE	Ville Laurikari	C	BSD	musl
TRegex	TRegex	Java	UPL-1.0	GraalVM
TRegExpr	TRegExpr, documentation, (RegExp Studio)	Object Pascal	Dual-license: freeware, or LGPL with static linking exception	Total Commander
Wolfram Language (Mathematica)	Wolfram Language Documentation Center	Wolfram Language	Proprietary	Mathematica, the Wolfram Development Platform
XRegExp	XRegExp	JavaScript	MIT	
YARR	YARR	C++	2-clause BSD	Safari, WebKit-based browsers, QML

== Languages ==
List of languages and frameworks including regular expression support
Language	Official website	Software license	Remarks
ActionScript 3	ActionScript Technology Center	Free	
APL (APLX, Dyalog, GNU)	APL Wiki	Licensed by the respective implementation	⎕SS (PCRE), ⎕R/⎕S (PCRE), ⎕SS (PCRE2), respectively
C++11 (C++)	C++ standards website	Licensed by the respective implementation	Since ISO14822:2011(e), similar to ECMAScript on default (Grammar Description)
D	D	Boost Software License	
Elixir	elixir-lang.org	Apache 2.0	Standard library includes PCRE-based Regex module. The matching algorithms of the library are based on the PCRE library, but not all of the PCRE library is interfaced and some parts of the library go beyond what PCRE offers. Currently PCRE version 8.40 (release date 2017-01-11) is used.
Erlang	erlang.org	Apache 2.0	Standard library includes PCRE-based re module. The matching algorithms of the library are based on the PCRE library, but not all of the PCRE library is interfaced and some parts of the library go beyond what PCRE offers. Currently PCRE version 8.40 (release date 2017-01-11) is used.
Free Pascal (Object Pascal)	freepascal.org	LGPL with static linking exception	Free Pascal 2.6+ ships with TRegExpr from Sorokin and two other regular expression libraries; See wiki.lazarus.freepascal.org/Regexpr.
Go	go.dev	BSD-style	
Haskell	Haskell.org	BSD3	Omitted in the language report, and in GHC's Hierarchical Libraries
Java	Java	GNU General Public License	REs are written as strings in source code: all backslashes must be doubled, harming readability.
JavaScript (ECMAScript)	ECMA-262	BSD3	First-class citizens of the language with a special /.../mod syntax. Historically feature-limited, but improved since ES2018. Two major regex engines: V8's Irregexp (used in Chrome and Blink-based browsers, as well as Firefox, Node.js) and JavaScriptCore's YARR (in Safari and WebKit-based browsers).
Julia	JuliaLang.org	MIT License	REs are part of the language core library using PCRE built-in and an optional wrapper for (C code) ICU is available.
Lua	Lua.org	MIT License	Uses simplified, limited dialect; can be bound to more powerful library, like PCRE or an alternative parser like LPeg.
Mathematica	Wolfram	Proprietary	
.NET	MSDN	MIT License	
Nim	nim-lang.org	MIT License	Standard library includes PCRE-based re and nre modules, as well as various alternatives (ex. strutils, pegs (Parsing Expression Grammar matching), strscans, parseutils, etc.).
OCaml	Caml	LGPL	As of 2010, the standard module is generally regarded as deprecated; often recommended libraries are pcre (with full support for PCRE) and re (which is not as complete but claims better performance and provides frontends to popular syntaxes: PCRE, Perl, Posix, Emacs, shell globbing).
Perl	Perl.com	Artistic License, or GNU General Public License	Full, central part of the language
PHP	PHP.net	PHP License	Has two implementations, with PCRE being the more efficient in speed, functions
POSIX C (C)	POSIX.1 web publication	Licensed by the respective implementation	Supports POSIX BRE and ERE syntax
Python	python.org	Python Software Foundation License	Python has two major implementations, the built in re and the regex library.
Ruby	ruby-lang.org	GNU Library General Public License	Ruby 1.8, Ruby 1.9, and Ruby 2.0 and later versions use different engines; Ruby 1.9 integrates Oniguruma, Ruby 2.0 and later integrate Onigmo, a fork from Oniguruma.
Rust	docs.rs	MIT License	The primary regex crate does not allow look-around expressions. There is an Oniguruma binding called onig that does.
SAP ABAP	SAP.com	Proprietary	
Tcl	tcl.tk	Tcl/Tk License (BSD-style)	Tcl library doubles as a regular expression library.
Wolfram Language	Wolfram Research	Proprietary: usable for free on a limited scale on the Wolfram Development platform	
XML Schema	W3C	Licensed by the respective implementation	
XPath 3/XQuery	W3C	Licensed by the respective implementation	

== Language features ==
NOTE: An application using a library for regular expression support does not necessarily support the full set of features of the library, e.g., GNU grep uses PCRE, but supports no lookahead, though PCRE does.

=== Part 1 ===
Language feature comparison (part 1)
	"+" quantifier	Negated character classes	Non-greedy quantifiers (Note: Non-greedy quantifiers match as few characters as possible, instead of the default as many. Note that many older, pre-POSIX engines were non-greedy and didn't have greedy quantifiers at all.)	Shy groups (Note: Shy groups, also called non-capturing groups cannot be referred to with backreferences; non-capturing groups are used to speed up matching where the group's content does not need to be accessed later.)	Recursion	Look-ahead	Look-behind	Backreferences (Note: Backreferences enable referring to previously matched groups in later parts of the regex and/or replacement string (where applicable). For instance, ([ab]+)\1 matches "abab" but not "abaab".)	>9 indexable captures
Boost.Regex	Yes	Yes	Yes	Yes	Yes	Yes	Yes	Yes	Yes
Boost.Xpressive	Yes	Yes	Yes	Yes	Yes	Yes	Yes	Yes	Yes
CL-PPCRE	Yes	Yes	Yes	Yes	No	Yes	Yes	Yes	Yes
EmEditor	Yes	Yes	Yes	Yes	No	Yes	Yes	Yes	No
FREJ	No (Note: FREJ have no repetitive quantifiers, but have "optional" element which behaves similar to simple "?" quantifier.)	No	Some	Yes	No	No	No	Yes	Yes
GLib/GRegex	Yes	Yes	Yes	Yes	Yes	Yes	Yes	Yes	Yes
GNU grep	Yes	Yes	Yes	Yes	No	Yes	Yes	Yes	—N/a
Haskell	Yes	Yes	Yes	Yes	No	Yes	Yes	Yes	Yes
RXP	Yes	Yes	Yes	Yes	No	No	No	Yes	Yes
ICU Regex	Yes	Yes	Yes	Yes	No	Yes	Yes	Yes	Yes
Java	Yes	Yes	Yes	Yes	No	Yes	Yes	Yes	Yes
JavaScript (ECMAScript)	Yes	Yes	Yes	Yes	No	Yes	Yes (Note: As of ES2018)	Yes	Yes
JGsoft	Yes	Yes	Yes	Yes	Yes	Yes	Yes	Yes	Yes
Lua	Yes	Yes	Some (Note: Lua's only non-greedy quantifier is -, which is a non-greedy version of *. It does not have non-greedy versions of + or ?; in the former case, the non-greedy effect can be achieved by repeating the token followed by -, but in the latter case, there is no equivalent.)	No	No	No	No	Yes	No
.NET	Yes	Yes	Yes	Yes	No	Yes	Yes	Yes	Yes
OCaml	Yes	Yes	No	No	No	No	No	Yes	No
PCRE	Yes	Yes	Yes	Yes	Yes	Yes	Yes	Yes	Yes
Perl	Yes	Yes	Yes	Yes	Yes	Yes	Yes	Yes	Yes
PHP	Yes	Yes	Yes	Yes	Yes	Yes	Yes	Yes	Yes
Python	Yes	Yes	Yes	Yes	Yes (Note: Supported by the optional regex library only.)	Yes	Yes	Yes	Yes
Qt/QRegExp	Yes	Yes	Yes	Yes	No	Yes	No	Yes	Yes
RE2	Yes	Yes	Yes	Yes	No	No	No	No	Yes
Regex+	Yes	Yes	Yes	Yes	No	Yes	Yes (Note: Variable-length, via underlying ES2018+ engine)	Yes	Yes
Ruby, Onigmo	Yes	Yes	Yes	Yes	Yes	Yes	Yes	Yes	Yes
TRE	Yes	Yes	Yes	Yes	No	No	No	Yes	No
Vim	Yes	Yes	Yes	Yes	No	Yes	Yes	Yes	No
RGX	Yes	Yes	Yes	Yes	No	Yes	Yes	Yes	Yes
Tcl	Yes	Yes	Yes	Yes	No	Yes	Yes	Yes	Yes
TRegExpr	Yes	?	Yes	?	?	?	?	?	?
XML Schema	Yes	Yes	No	—N/a	No	No	No	No	—N/a
XPath 3/XQuery	Yes	Yes	Yes	Yes	No	No	No	Yes	Yes
XRegExp	Yes	Yes	Yes	Yes	No	Yes	Yes	Yes	Yes

=== Part 2 ===
Language feature comparison (part 2)
	Directives (Note: Also known as flags modifiers, modes modifiers or option letters. Example pattern: "(?i:test)".)	Conditionals	Atomic groups (Note: Also called independent sub-expressions.)	Named capture (Note: Similar to back references, but with names instead of indices.)	Comments	Embedded code	Unicode property support	Balancing groups (Note: Special feature allowing to match balanced constructs without recursion.)	Variable-length look-behinds (Note: Refers to the possibility of including quantifiers in look-behinds, thus making their length unpredictable.)
Boost.Regex	Yes	Yes	Yes	Yes	Yes	No	Some (Note: Unicode property support may be incomplete (products are continuously updated!). All will be incomplete when a new Unicode revision is released until they are updated to comply.)	No	No
Boost.Xpressive	Yes	No	Yes	Yes	Yes	No	No	No	No
CL-PPCRE	Yes	Yes	Yes	Yes	Yes	Yes	Some	No	No
EmEditor	Yes	Yes	?	?	Yes	No	?	No	No
FREJ	No	No	Yes	Yes	Yes	No	?	No	No
GLib/GRegex	Yes	Yes	Yes	Yes	Yes	No	Some	No	No
GNU grep	Yes	Yes	?	Yes	Yes	No	No	No	No
Haskell	?	?	?	?	?	No	No	No	No
RXP	Yes	Yes	No	Yes	Yes	No	No	No	No
ICU Regex	Yes	No	Yes	Yes (Note: Available as of ICU55.)	Yes	No	Yes	No	No
Java	Yes	No	Yes	Yes (Note: Available as of JDK7.)	Yes	No	Some	No	No
JavaScript (ECMAScript)	No	No	No	Yes	No	No	Some (Note: The support and range of properties is dependent on implementation.)	No	Yes
JGsoft	Yes	Yes	Yes	Yes	Yes	No	Some	No	Yes
Lua	No	No	No	No	No	No	No	No	No
.NET	Yes	Yes	Yes	Yes	Yes	No	Some	Yes	Yes
OCaml	No	No	No	No	No	No	No	No	No
PCRE	Yes	Yes	Yes	Yes	Yes	Yes	Yes	No	No
Perl	Yes	Yes	Yes	Yes	Yes	Yes	Yes	No	No (Note: Experimental support added in v5.29.9.)
PHP	Yes	Yes	Yes	Yes	Yes	No	No	No	No
Python	Yes	Yes	Yes (Note: Supported by Python v3.11 and later, and the optional regex library only.)	Yes	Yes	No	Yes (Note: May only be available in the regex library when used with Python versions after 3.3.)	No	Yes (Note: Supported by the optional regex library only.)
Qt/QRegExp	No	No	No	No	No	No	No	No	No
RE2	Yes	No	?	Yes	No	No	Some	No	No
Regex+	Yes (Note: via (?ims:...) style)	No	Yes (Note: (?>...) - transpiled to native)	Yes (Note: ES2018 (?<name>... syntax))	Yes (Note: x flag (free-spacing mode, always on))	No	Yes (Note: via always-on v flag)	No	Yes (Note: via underlying ES2018+ engine)
Ruby, Onigmo	Yes	Yes	Yes	Yes	Yes	No	Some	No	No
Tcl	Yes	No	Yes	No	Yes	No	Yes	No	No
TRE	Yes	No	No	No	Yes	No	?	No	No
Vim	Yes	No	Yes	No	No	No	No	No	Yes
RGX	Yes	Yes	Yes	Yes	Yes	No	Yes	No	No
XML Schema	No	No	No	No	No	No	Yes	No	No
XPath 3/XQuery	No	No	No	No	No	No	Yes	No	No
XRegExp	Leading only	No	No	Yes	Yes	No	Yes	No	Yes

== API features ==
API feature comparison
	Native UTF-16 support (Note: Means the format can be used internally without explicit conversion.)	Native UTF-8 support	Multi-line matching	Partial match (Note: Partial match of the whole regular expression. For example the pattern ".*END$" will match any string partially, but only strings ending with END fully..)
Boost.Regex	No	No	Yes	Yes
GLib/GRegex	Yes	Yes	Yes	Yes
RXP	Yes	Yes	No	Yes
ICU Regex	Yes	No	Yes	?
Java	Yes (Note: Supports Unicode 15.0 standard from 2023..)	Yes	Yes	Yes
.NET	No (Note: Implementation uses original UCS-2 support/features, so it only recognizes 64K chars total (vs UTF-16's 1,112,064 characters). A Microsoft developer-representative answered a bug report on this as "will not fix" in 2010..)	Yes	Yes	?
PCRE	Yes (Note: Since version 8.30.)	Yes	Yes	Yes
Qt/QRegExp	Yes	No	No	Yes (Note: Partial matching is performed implicitly, requiring a separate call to matchedLength() if an exact match fails.)
Qt/QRegularExpression	Yes	Yes	Yes	Yes
Tcl	Yes	Yes (Note: Tcl includes facilities to convert to and from UTF-8.)	Yes	?
TRE	Yes	Yes	Yes	?
RGX	No	No	Yes	?
wxWidgets::wxRegEx (Note: wxRegEx uses any system supplied POSIX library or if not available and for Unicode mode uses Henry Spencer's library.)	Yes	Yes	Yes	?
XRegExp	Yes	Yes	Yes	No

== See also ==
- Regular expression § Implementations and running times
- Comparison of parser generators
