= Levenshtein automaton =

Mathematical model for string comparison

In computer science, a Levenshtein automaton for a string w and a number n is a finite-state automaton that can recognize the set of all strings whose Levenshtein distance from w is at most n. That is, a string x is in the formal language recognized by the Levenshtein automaton if and only if x can be transformed into w by at most n single-character insertions, deletions, and substitutions.

== Applications ==
Levenshtein automata may be used for spelling correction, by finding words in a given dictionary that are close to a misspelled word. In this application, once a word is identified as being misspelled, its Levenshtein automaton may be constructed, and then applied to all of the words in the dictionary to determine which ones are close to the misspelled word. If the dictionary is stored in compressed form as a trie, the time for this algorithm (after the automaton has been constructed) is proportional to the number of nodes in the trie, significantly faster than using dynamic programming to compute the Levenshtein distance separately for each dictionary word.

It is also possible to find words in a regular language, rather than a finite dictionary, that are close to a given target word, by computing the Levenshtein automaton for the word, and then using a Cartesian product construction to combine it with an automaton for the regular language, giving an automaton for the intersection language. Alternatively, rather than using the product construction, both the Levenshtein automaton and the automaton for the given regular language may be traversed simultaneously using a backtracking algorithm.

Levenshtein automata are used in Lucene for full-text searches that can return relevant documents even if the query is misspelled.

== Construction ==
For any fixed constant n, the Levenshtein automaton for w and n may be constructed in time O(|w|).

Mitankin studies a variant of this construction called the universal Levenshtein automaton, determined only by a numeric parameter n, that can recognize pairs of words (encoded in a certain way by bitvectors) that are within Levenshtein distance n of each other. Touzet proposed an effective algorithm to build this automaton.

Yet a third finite automaton construction of Levenshtein (or Damerau–Levenshtein) distance are the Levenshtein transducers of Hassan et al., who show finite state transducers implementing edit distance one, then compose these to implement edit distances up to some constant.

== See also ==
- agrep, tool (implemented several times) for approximate regular expression matching
- TRE, library for regular expression matching that is tolerant to Levenshtein-style edits
