= GyazMail =

Email client for macOS

- Developer: Goichi Hirakawa
- Release: June 24, 2003; 23 years ago (1.0.1)
- Stable release: 1.8 / May 2, 2026; 3 months ago
- Operating system: macOS
- Type: Email
- License: proprietary
- Website: gyazsquare.com/gyazmail/

GyazMail is an email client for macOS, developed and maintained by Japanese programmer Goichi Hirakawa. It supports the POP3, IMAP and SMTP protocols. Its handling of multiple email accounts includes local mailboxes.

Gyazmail is based on the native macOS Cocoa and written in Objective-C. For its search function, GyazMail uses the Oniguruma regular expression library, which supports a variety of character encodings, which is especially relevant for Asian languages.

Version 1.0.1 was released in 2003. Starting May 30, 2022, GyazMail ended support for Google Accounts due to Google's requirement of OAuth, which was cost prohibitive.

== Features ==
- Supports IMAP, POP3 and local storage folders
- An option exists for setting maximum line width when sending mails. This is helpful where autowrap is not supported, such as for newsgroups, which require a maximum line with of 72 characters, with a hard wrap.
- Message threading is supported
- Multiple accounts
- Sorting rules for incoming and outgoing mail can be defined
