= TextMate =

GUI text editor for macOS

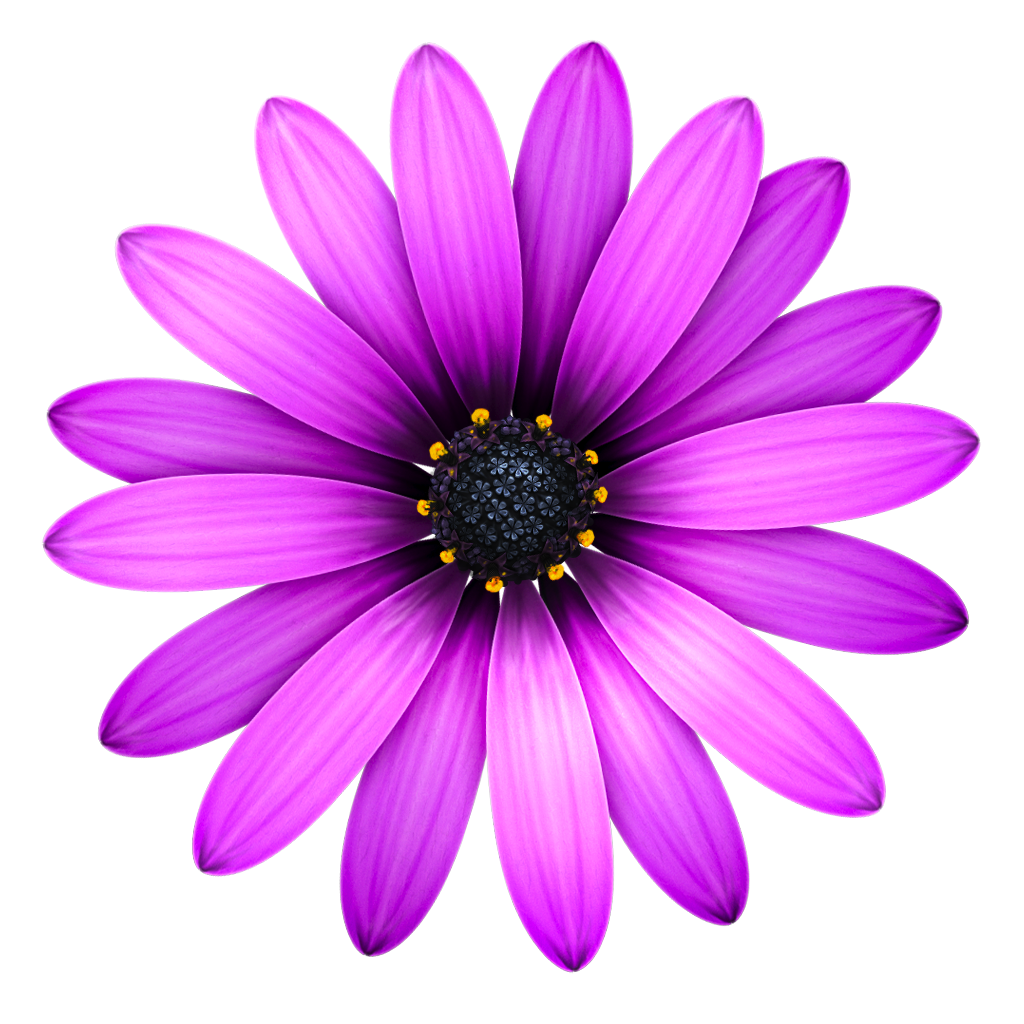

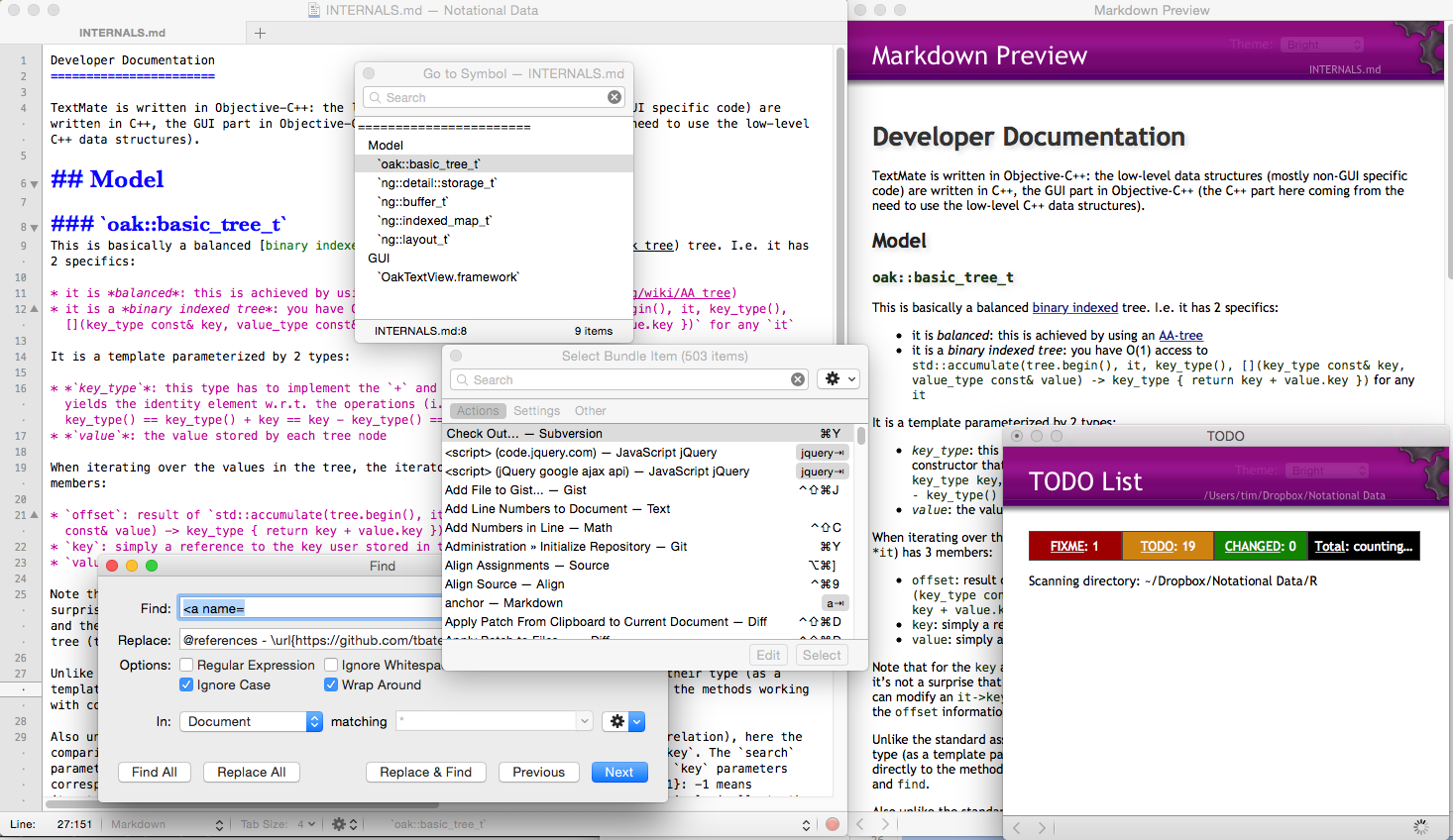
- Textmate screenshot
- Developers: Allan Odgaard (MacroMates), Ciarán Walsh
- Release: 5 October 2004; 22 years ago
- Final release: 2.0.23 / 12 October 2021
- Operating system: macOS
- Type: Source code editor
- License: 2.0: GPL-3.0-or-later; 1.0: Proprietary
- Website: macromates.com
- Repository: github.com/textmate/textmate

TextMate is a free and open-source general-purpose GUI text editor for macOS created by Allan Odgaard. TextMate features declarative customizations, tabs for open documents, recordable macros, folding sections, snippets, shell integration, and an extensible bundle system.

== History ==
TextMate 1.0 was released on 5 October 2004, after 5 months of development, followed by version 1.0.1 on 21 October 2004. The release focused on implementing a small feature set well, and did not have a preference window or a toolbar, didn't integrate FTP, and had no options for printing. At first only a small number of programming languages were supported, as only a few “language bundles” had been created. Even so, some developers found this early and incomplete version of TextMate a welcome change to a market that was considered stagnant by the decade-long dominance of BBEdit.

TextMate 1.0.2 came out on 10 December 2004. In the series of TextMate 1.1 betas, TextMate gained several new features, including a preferences window with a GUI for creating and editing themes; a status bar with a symbol list; menus for choosing language and tab settings, and a “bundle editor” for editing language-specific customizations. On 6 January 2006, Odgaard released TextMate 1.5, the first “stable release” since 1.0.2. Reviews were positive, in contrast to earlier versions that had been criticised.

TextMate continued to develop through mid-2006. On 8 August 2006, TextMate was awarded the Apple Design Award for Best Developer Tool, at Apple's Worldwide Developers Conference in San Francisco, California. In February 2006, the TextMate blog expressed intentions for future directions, including improved project management, with a plug-in system to support remote file systems such as FTP, and revision control systems such as Subversion. Throughout 2007, the core application changed only minimally, though its “language bundles” continued to advance.

In June 2009, TextMate 2 was announced as being about 90 percent complete, but with an undisclosed final-feature list. A public alpha was made available for download on the TextMate blog in December 2011, followed by a release candidate at the end of 2016. In September 2019, a final version was released.

In August 2012, TextMate 2's source code was published on GitHub under the terms of GPL-3.0-or-later, an attempt by the developer to counteract restrictions Apple placed on software distributed through the Mac App Store. Odgaard stated he prefers receiving patches as public domain as this preserves his ability to release a future version under a more permissive license, or to make a version available on the Mac App Store. Odgaard also stated he has a friend who uses some of TextMate's frameworks in a closed-source project, and they could not incorporate patches released under GPL.

In October 2021, the latest/last commit was made to GitHub, though no announcement has been made to the effect that the project has been officially abandoned and its source code is still publicly available.

== Features ==
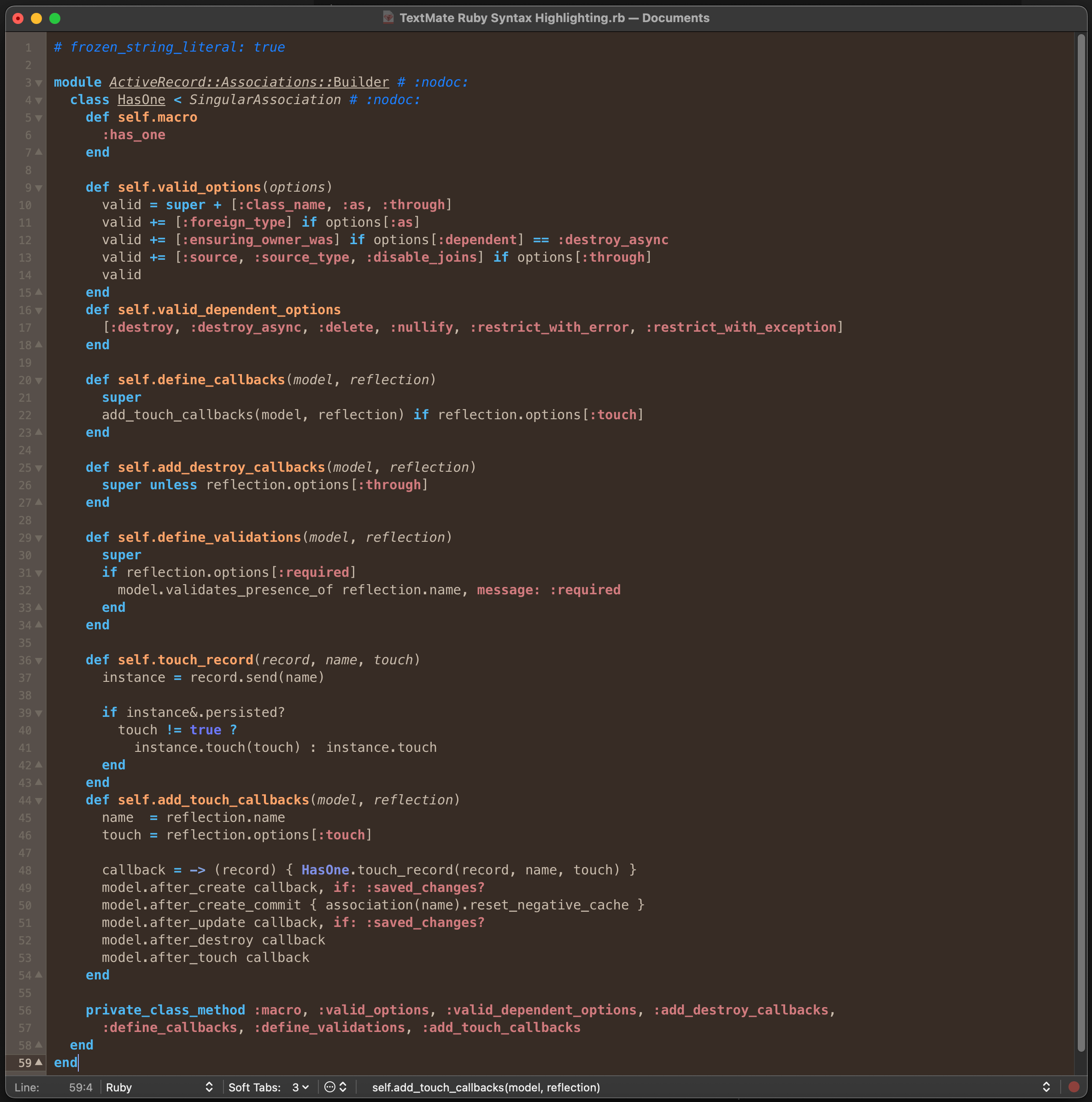
TextMate Ruby syntax highlighting

=== Language grammars ===
TextMate language grammars allows users to create their own arbitrarily complex syntax highlighting modes by assigning each document keyword a unique name. It uses a modified version of the Apple ASCII property list format to define language grammars. These grammars allow nesting rules to be defined using the Oniguruma regular expression library, and then assigned specific “scopes”: compound labels which identify them for coloration.

Each point of a document is assigned one or more scopes, which define where in the document the point is, how it should be colored, and what the behavior of TextMate should be at that point. For instance, the title of one of the links in the “External links” section has the scope:

text.html.mediawiki
    markup.list.mediawiki
        meta.link.inline.external.mediawiki
            string.other.link.title.external.mediawiki

This scope tells us that we are looking at a link title within a link within a list within a MediaWiki document.

TextMate themes can mark up any scope, at varying levels of precision. For instance, one theme may decide to color every constant (constant.*) identically, while another may decide that numerical constants (constant.numeric.*) should be colored differently than escaped characters (constant.character.escape.*). The hierarchal scope syntax allows language authors and theme authors various levels of coverage, so that each one can choose to opt for simplicity or comprehensiveness, as desired.

TextMate documentation provides a list of naming commonly used across different programming languages for interoperability between bundles.

=== Commands ===
TextMate supports user-defined and user-editable commands that are interpreted by bash or the interpreter specified with a shebang. Commands can be sent many kinds of input by TextMate (the current document, selected text, the current word, etc.) in addition to environment variables and their output can be similarly be handled by TextMate in a variety of ways. At its most simple, a command might receive the selected text, transform it, and re-insert it into the document replacing the selection. Other commands might simply show a tool tip, create a new document for their output, or display it as a web page using TextMate's built-in HTML renderer.

Many language-specific bundles such as bash, PHP or Ruby contain commands for compiling and/or running the current document or project. In many cases the STDOUT and STDERR of the code's process will be displayed in a window in TextMate.

=== Snippets ===
At their simplest, TextMate “snippets” are pieces of text which can be inserted into the document at the current location via a context-sensitive key stroke or tab completion. Snippets are "intelligent", supporting "tab stops" dynamic updating, access to environment variables, and the ability to run inline scripts. This allows complicated behaviors. Tab stops can be cycled through using the “tab” key and support default text, drop-downs, to complete elements of the snippet. The results of these tab stops can be dynamically changed in another portion of the snippet, as the user fills in a stop. TextMate environment variables can be used, supporting information about the current scope, line number, or author name, etc. Snippets also have the ability to run inline shell scripts.

=== Bundles ===
TextMate language grammars, snippets, macros, commands, and templates can be grouped into “bundles” of functionality. Any snippet, macro, or command can be executed by pressing a keyboard shortcut, by typing a particular word and then pressing the “tab” key (so-called “tab triggers”), or by selecting the command from a menu. Tab triggers are particularly useful; the combination of tab triggers and snippets greatly eases coding in verbose languages, or languages with commonly typed patterns.

Snippets, macros, and commands can be limited to a particular scope, so that for instance the “close html tag” command does not work in a python script, freeing up that keyboard shortcut to be used for something else. This allows individual languages, and even individual scopes, to override built-in commands such as “Reformat Paragraph” with more specialized versions. Even special keys such as the return key and spacebar can be overridden.

A Subversion repository is available containing many more bundles than are shipped with the editor package, for everything from Markdown to blogging to MIPS assembly language.

=== Project management ===
Several documents or folders can be opened at once in a TextMate project window, which provides a drawer along its side listing file and folder names, and a series of tabs across the top. In TextMate 1.5, this drawer provides a means for users to organize files and folders from across the file system, as well as the ability to create virtual folders for further organization. This feature was removed from TextMate 2 and replaced with an ordinary file browser. Search and replace can be undertaken across an entire project, and commands can interact with the selected files or folders in the drawer. Bundles for CVS, Subversion, darcs, and other revision control systems allow TextMate to manage versioned code.

=== Other features ===
TextMate has many features common to programming editors:

- Folding code sections can be used to hide areas of a document not currently being edited, for a more compact view of code structure or to avoid distraction. The sections to be folded can be selected by hand, or the structure of the document itself can be used to determine foldings.
- Regular-expression–based search and replace speeds complicated text manipulations. TextMate uses the Oniguruma regular expression library developed by K. Kosako.
- A function pop-up provides a list of sections or functions in the current document.
- Clipboard history allows users to cut many sections of text at once, and then paste them.
- Column editing mode allows adding the same text to several rows of text, and is very useful for manipulating tabular data.
- "rmate" support for launching textmate as editor for files from remote servers - much improved over work-arounds needed in version 1

In addition, TextMate supports features to integrate well with the OS X graphical environment:

- Clipboard graphical history supports pasting from previous copies, including prior launches.
- Find and replace support an analogous graphical history.
- Editing is further enhanced by multiple cursors (insertion points), and the ability to extend the current selection to additional instances creating multiple cursors.
- A WebKit-based HTML view window shows live updates as an HTML document is edited.
- VoiceOver and Zoom users can use TextMate thanks to its accessibility support.

=== Limitations ===
TextMate does have a few limitations when compared to other editors in its class:

- Because TextMate is not tightly coupled to a scripting language, as Emacs is to Emacs Lisp, it is impossible for users to have complete control over the program's configuration and behavior. Allan Odgaard explained his thoughts on the subject in an email to the TextMate mailing list, advocating for "platform-recommended" solutions.
- No built-in HTML validator — because TextMate uses the W3C validator for HTML validation, users must have an active network connection to validate HTML using the standard functionality.
- Lack of code-completion feature: despite its substantial support for macros, commands, and snippets, TextMate has no built-in support for code-hinting or guided code-completion, so text editors that support these features may prove to be a better choice when learning the syntax of a new language or coding in verbose languages. Remark: you can get code/word suggestions by typing one or more letters and (repeatedly) pressing ESC. The suggestions are words that occur in the current document.
- TextMate is not binary safe. It is explicitly text only, and does not guarantee that arbitrary binary data in a file will be preserved through a load/save cycle, regardless of whether that data is edited.

== Awards ==
TextMate 1.5 won the Apple Design Award for best developer tool in 2006.

== See also ==
- Comparison of text editors
