= Ricardo Baeza-Yates =

Chilean computer scientist

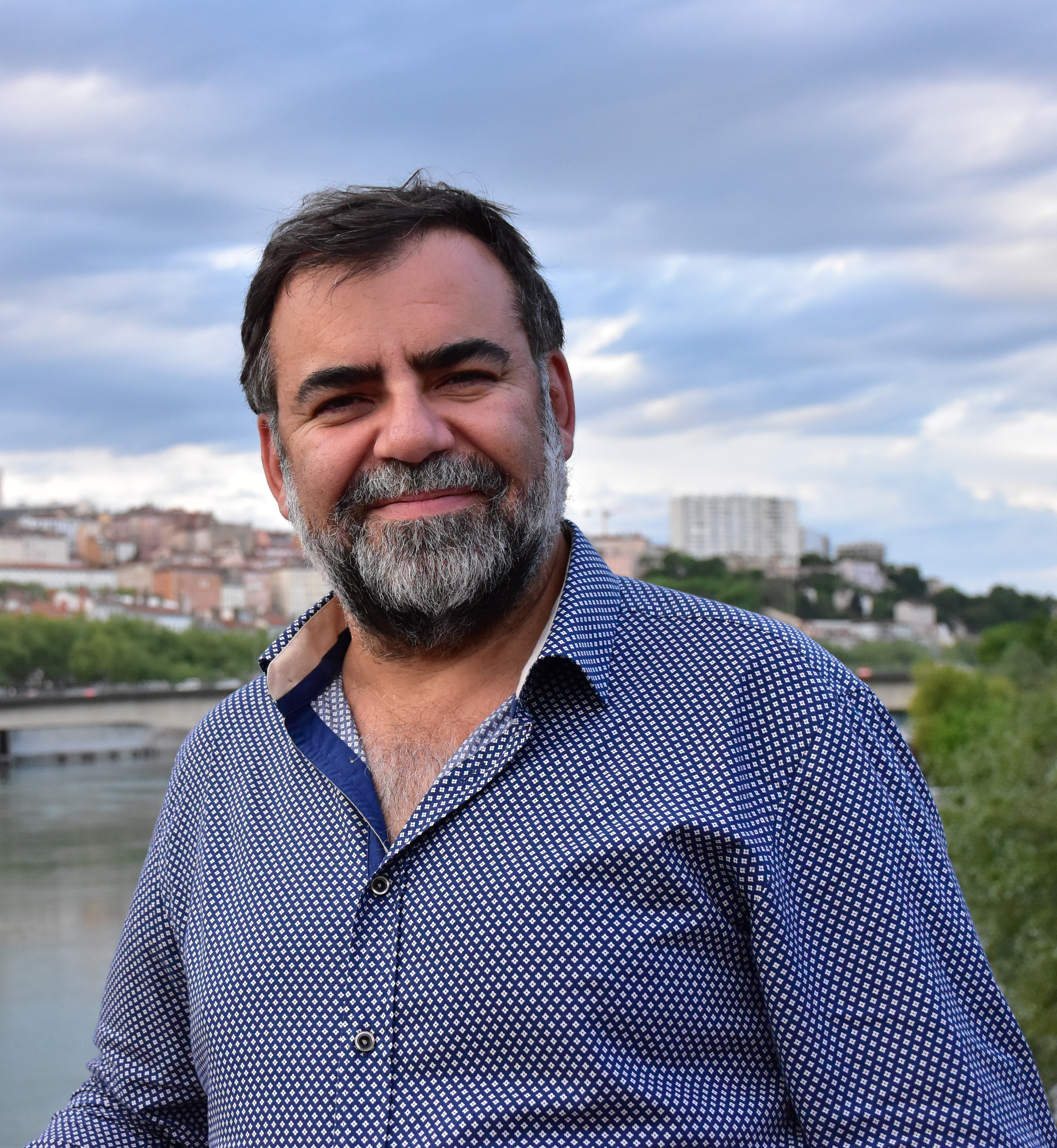
- Born: March 21, 1961 (age 65); Chile
- Education: University of Waterloo; University of Chile
- Known for: Shift Or Algorithm
- Awards: ACM Fellow; IEEE Fellow
- Scientific career
- Fields: Computer science Data science
- Workplaces: Royal Institute of Technology; Northeastern University; NTENT; Yahoo! Labs; Pompeu Fabra University; University of Chile
- Thesis: Efficient Text Searching (1989)
- Doctoral advisor: Gaston Gonnet
- Notable students: Gonzalo Navarro
- Website: www.baeza.cl

Ricardo A. Baeza-Yates (born March 21, 1961) is a Chilean computer scientist specializing in algorithms, data structures, information retrieval, web search and responsible AI. Since 2025 he is a part-time Wallenberg AI, Autonomous Systems and Software Program professor at the KTH Royal Institute of Technology of Sweden in Stockholm. He is also part-time professor at Universitat Pompeu Fabra in Barcelona and Universidad de Chile in Santiago. He is an expert member of the Global Partnership on Artificial Intelligence, a member of the Association for Computing Machinery's US Technology Policy Committee as well as IEEE's AI Committee.

He is member of the Chilean Academy of Sciences (2002), founding member of the Chilean Academy of Engineering (2010), corresponding member of the Brazilian Academy of Sciences (2018), and member of the Academia Europaea (2023). He is an ACM Fellow (2009). and an IEEE Fellow (2011). He is a former member of Spain's Advisory Council on AI (2019–2023).

From January 2021 to March 2025 he was the Director of Research at the Institute for Experiential AI at Northeastern University in the Silicon Valley campus. From June 2016 until June 2020 he was CTO of NTENT, a semantic search technology company. Before, from January 2006 until February 2016, he was VP of Research for Yahoo! Labs, leading teams in United States, Europe, Asia and Latin America.

== Education ==
He obtained a PhD from the University of Waterloo with Efficient Text Searching, supervised by Gaston Gonnet and granted in 1989.

== Research contributions ==
- Algorithms and data structures. His contributions include algorithms for string search such as the Shift Or Algorithm and algorithms for Fuzzy string searching, inspiring also the Bitap algorithm; co-author of the Handbook of Algorithms and Data Structures (ISBN 0-201-14218-X) with his former PhD advisor Gaston Gonnet,
- Information retrieval. Co-author of Modern Information retrieval Addison Wesley (ISBN 0-201-39829-X), first edition in 1999 and a second edition in 2011 that won the 2012 book of the year award of the Association for Information Science and Technology.
- Web search and mining. Baeza-Yates founded in 2002 and directed until 2005 the Center for Web Research in the Department of Computer Science of the University of Chile. His latest work on this area focuses on bias on the Web, giving the Gödel Lecture 2017 in Viena.
- Responsible AI. He is one of the two main authors of the 2022 ACM Principles for Responsible Algorithmic Systems. He published an introduction to this topic.

== Recognition ==
Dr. Baeza-Yates was awarded one of the Spanish national Computer Science awards in 2018 as well as the J.W. Graham Medal in Computing and Innovation by the University of Waterloo, Canada, in 2007. In August 2008, Dr. Baeza-Yates was proposed for the first time to the Chilean National Prize in Applied Sciences (Premio Nacional de Ciencias Aplicadas). He has been proposed again most of even years when this award is given. In 2024, he won the award.

== See also ==
- List of University of Waterloo people
