= Open Hub =

Public directory of free and open source software (FOSS)

- Former name: Ohloh
- Website type: Public directory of free and open-source software (FOSS)
- Owner: Black Duck Software
- Creators: Jason Allen and Scott Collison
- Website: openhub.net
- Commercial: yes
- Launched: 1 January 2006; 20 years ago
- Current status: Active
- Content license: Proprietary; interface Apache License

Logo of Ohloh in 2012, the former name of Open Hub.

Open Hub or Black Duck Open Hub (formerly Ohloh) is a web site providing a web services suite and online community platform that aims to index the open-source software development community. It was founded by former Microsoft managers Jason Allen and Scott Collison in 2004 and joined by the developer Robin Luckey. As of 15 January 2016, the site lists 669,601 open-source projects, 681,345 source control repositories, 3,848,524 contributors and 31,688,426,179 lines of code.

In 2017, Black Duck Software, the company running the site, was acquired by Synopsys for $565 million, but it was spun out as a separate company again in October 2024.

== History ==
Ohloh was founded by former Microsoft managers Jason Allen and Scott Collison in 2004, joined by developer Robin Luckey. On 28 May 2009, Ohloh was acquired by Geeknet, owners of the popular open-source development platform SourceForge. However, Geeknet sold Ohloh to the open-source analysis company Black Duck Software on 5 October 2010. Black Duck integrated Ohloh's functionality with their existing products to advance the site into a major resource for FOSS development. On 18 July 2014, Ohloh became Black Duck Open Hub. In late August 2014, the Black Duck Open Hub's Organizations feature moved out of Beta and into Version 1.0.

== Functionality and features ==
By retrieving data from revision control repositories, such as CVS, SVN, Git, Bazaar, and Mercurial, Black Duck Open Hub provides statistics about the longevity of projects, their licenses, including license conflict information, as well as software metrics, such as source lines of code and commit statistics. The codebase history informs about the amount of activity for each project. Software stacks — list of software applications used by Black Duck Open Hub's members — and tags are used to calculate the similarity between projects.

Global statistics per language measure the popularity of specific programming languages since the early 1990s. Those global statistics across all projects in Black Duck Open Hub have also been used to identify those with the most extensive continuous revision control histories.

Contributor statistics are also available, measuring open-source developers' experience as observable in code committed to revision control repositories. Social network features (kudos) have been introduced to allow users to rank open-source contributors. A KudoRank for each user and open-source contributor on a scale of 1 to 10 is automatically extracted from all kudos in the system. The idea of measuring open-source developers' skills and productivity on the basis of commit statistics or mutual rating has received mixed reactions in technology blogs. Contributor profiles may also contain a contributor supplied email address, and avatars loaded from Gravatar using that email address.

On 22 August 2007, a public beta of a web-service API was announced, exposing Black Duck Open Hub's data and reports to promote the development of third-party applications.

On 18 January 2013, the team announced a new metric, the Project Activity Indicator (PAI). The PAI combines the number of contributors and the number of commits in an algorithm that weighs more recent activity more heavily than past activity. Activity is normalized so that all projects can be considered and weighed equally one against another; that activity assessment is scaled relatively to the number of project contributors and commits.

On 14 January 2014, the team announced a new score, the Project Hotness Score. The PAI shows long-term activity and growth on FOSS projects, but its requirement that there be at least a year of data means that new projects can't be ranked. The Project Hotness Score looks at activity over the past few weeks and evaluates daily activity to identify those projects. By design, the Project Hotness Score is highly volatile.

On 6 April 2016, the team announced Hub 3.0, which streamlined continuous integration and DevOps processes through policy management and rapid scanning capabilities.

== Code search ==
In 2012, Black Duck Open Hub launched Open Hub Code Search, a free code search engine based on the predecessor Koders. It could search over 21 billion lines of open-source code and filter by language, project or syntax, but was discontinued in 2016.

== See also ==
- Google Code Search
- Koders
- Krugle
- Protecode
