= Smail =

- Developer(s): Ronald S. Karr, Landon Curt Noll, and many others; currently maintained by Greg A. Woods
- Stable release: 3.2.0.121 / November 2, 2005; 19 years ago
- Operating system: Unix-like
- Platform: Cross-platform
- Type: Mail transfer agent
- License: GNU General Public License
- Website: www.weird.com/~woods/projects/smail.html

Smail-3 is a mail transfer agent (MTA) used on Unix-like operating systems. It is Free Software and is licensed under the GNU GPL. It aims to be a general and flexible mailer with extensive facilities for checking incoming e-mail and for routing between disparate networks. It is still in use on the Internet, but it has been mostly superseded by Exim (which was originally based on Smail) and other more modern mail transfer agents.

Smail-3 still follows a monolithic design model where a single binary controls the core facilities of the MTA. This type of monolithic design is generally considered to be inherently less secure, largely because the whole program normally runs with full system privileges at all times. Nevertheless, Smail's security record has been fairly clean, and has only been the subject of one BUGTRAQ advisory. It was designed with security as a primary goal and makes use of several key safe coding practices to avoid some of the most common pitfalls of similar large programs written in C.
