= Oniguruma =

Open-source Library in Programming

- Original author: K. Kosako
- Initial release: 25 February 2002
- Final release: 6.9.10 / 1 January 2025; 12 months ago
- Repository: github.com/kkos/oniguruma
- Written in: C
- Operating system: Cross-platform
- Type: regular expression library
- License: 2-clause BSD License

Oniguruma (鬼車) is a free and open-source regular expression library that supports a variety of character encodings, written by K. Kosako. The Ruby programming language, in version 1.9, as well as PHP's multi-byte string module (since PHP5), use Oniguruma as their regular expression engine. It is also used in products such as Atom, EDK2 UEFI, GyazMail, Take Command Console, Tera Term, TextMate, SubEthaEdit, jq, Sublime Text and VS Code.

As of April 26, 2025, development of Oniguruma was stopped and the project was archived.

There used to be also a fork of Oniguruma called "Onigmo" (Oniguruma-mod) which includes some features introduced in Perl 5.10+. Ruby switched to it in version 2.0 and features have been backported from Ruby to Onigmo. Take Command Console from version 20 to version 32 used to Onigmo. Take Command switched back to Oniguruma in version 33 as Onigmo is no longer being updated.

== See also ==
- Comparison of regular expression engines
