= Resident Evil 2 (disambiguation) =

Resident Evil 2 is a 1998 video game.

Resident Evil 2 may also refer to:

- Resident Evil 2 (2019 video game), 2019 remake of the above
- Resident Evil: Apocalypse, the second live-action film in the Resident Evil series, released in 2004
- Resident Evil: Damnation, the second CG film in the Resident Evil series, released in 2012
