= Agrep =

Approximate string matching program

agrep
- Developers: Udi Manber; Sun Wu
- Release: 1988; 38 years ago
- Stable release: 3.41.5
- Written in: C
- Operating system: Unix-like; OS/2; MS-DOS; Windows
- Type: Pattern matching
- License: ISC open source license
- Website: www.tgries.de/agrep
- Repository: github.com/Wikinaut/agrep

agrep (approximate grep) is an open-source approximate string matching program, developed by Udi Manber and Sun Wu between 1988 and 1991, for use with the Unix operating system. It was ported to OS/2, MS-DOS, and Windows.

It selects the best-suited algorithm for the current query from a multiple built-in string searching algorithms, including Manber and Wu's bitap algorithm based on Levenshtein distances.

agrep is also the search engine in the indexer program GLIMPSE. agrep is under a free ISC License.

== Alternative implementations ==
A more recent agrep is the command-line tool provided with the TRE regular expression library. TRE agrep is more powerful than Wu-Manber agrep since it allows weights and total costs to be assigned separately to individual groups in the pattern. It can also handle Unicode. Unlike Wu-Manber agrep, TRE agrep is licensed under a 2-clause BSD-like license.

FREJ (Fuzzy Regular Expressions for Java) open-source library provides command-line interface which could be used in the way similar to agrep. Unlike agrep or TRE it could be used for constructing complex substitutions for matched text. However its syntax and matching abilities differs significantly from ones of ordinary regular expressions.

== See also ==
- Bitap algorithm
- TRE (computing)
