= Gonzalo Navarro =

- Born: June 9, 1969 (age 57); Argentina
- Education: University of Chile National University of La Plata Escuela Superior Latinoamericana de Informática
- Scientific career
- Fields: Computer science Algorithms; Data structures Data compression Text searching
- Workplaces: University of Chile
- Thesis: Approximate Text Searching (1998)
- Doctoral advisor: Ricardo Baeza-Yates
- Website: users.dcc.uchile.cl/~gnavarro/

Gonzalo Navarro Badino (born June 9, 1969) is a full professor of computer science at the University of Chile and ACM Fellow, whose interests include algorithms and data structures, data compression and text searching. He also participates in the Center for Biotechnology and Bioengineering (CeBiB) and the Millennium Institute for Foundational Research on Data (IMFD).. He obtained his PhD at the University of Chile in 1998 under the supervision of Ricardo Baeza-Yates with the thesis Approximate Text Searching, then worked as a post-doctoral researcher with Esko Ukkonen and Maxime Crochemore.

He is one of the most prolific and highly cited researchers in Latin America, having authored the books Flexible Pattern Matching in Strings and Compact Data Structures, around 25 book chapters, over 160 journal articles and over 240 conference papers. He is editor in chief of the ACM Journal of Experimental Algorithmics (JEA) and a member of the editorial board of Information Systems, and has been guest editor of special issues of ACM SIGSPATIAL, the Journal of Discrete Algorithms, Information Systems and Algorithmica.

He created the Workshop on Compression, Text and Algorithms (WCTA) in 2005 and co-created the conference SISAP in 2008; has chaired or co-chaired SPIRE 2001, SCCC 2004, SPIRE 2005, SIGIR 2005 (posters), IFIP TCS 2006, SISAP 2008, SISAP 2012, LATIN 2016, SPIRE 2018 and CPM 2018; served on the steering committees of SPIRE, LATIN and SISAP; and has given around 50 invited talks, including 12 plenary talks and 5 tutorials in international conferences.

== Education ==
He studied for his Licenciate in Informatics (1989–1992) (5 years plus thesis) from Latin American School of Informatics (ESLAI, Argentina). His thesis was: “A Study on Control Structures”. His advisor was Prof. Jorge Aguirre (ESLAI and Universidad de Buenos Aires, Argentina).

He studied for his Licenciate in Informatics (1986–1993) (5 years plus thesis), at the Faculty of Exact Sciences, Universidad Nacional de La Plata (UNLP, Argentina). His thesis was: “MediaCore: A Multimedia Interface Composition Toolkit”, Advisor: Prof. Jorge Sanz (IBM Argentina and Almaden Research Center).

He received a MSc. in computer science (1994–1995), from Faculty of Physics and Mathematical Sciences, Universidad de Chile with Prof. Ricardo Baeza-Yates (Universidad de Chile) as his advisor. His thesis was: “A Language for Queries on Structure and Contents of Textual Databases”.

He received his PhD in computer science (1995–1998), from Faculty of Physics and Mathematical Sciences, Universidad de Chile under advisor: Prof. Ricardo Baeza-Yates (Universidad de Chile). His thesis was: “Approximate Text Searching”.

== Awards and distinctions ==
- 2022: ACM Fellow
- 2018: ACM Distinguished Member
- 2016: Article "On compressing and indexing repetitive sequences", with Sebastian Kreft, included in the Virtual Special Issue "40th Anniversary of Theoretical Computer Science -- Top Cited Articles: 1975–2014", which collects the most cited articles of each year.
- 2016: Highest Cited Paper Award of Elsevier, for the articles "On compressing and indexing repetitive sequences" and "Colored range queries and document retrieval", which are among the 5 most cited papers in Theoretical Computer Science. Similar award for the article "DACs: Bringing direct access to variable-length codes", among the 5 most cited in Information Processing and Management, and "Improved Compressed Indexes for Full-Text Document Retrieval", among the 5 most cited in Journal of Discrete Algorithms.
- 2009: Included in the book "70 Stories of success in Innovation and Science", published by the Ministry of Economy and several government research funding agencies, Chile, 2009.
- 2008: Award Scopus Chile 2008 in Computer Science, Mathematics and Engineering, awarded by Elsevier to researchers with high scientific productivity, with the support of Conicyt (Chile)
- 1996: First prize in the III CLEI-UNESCO Contest of Latin American Computer Science MSc. Theses.
