= Koders =

Koders (merged into Open Hub)
- Website type: Open source search engine
- Owner: Black Duck Software
- Website: koders.com
- Commercial: yes
- Launched: 2000; 26 years ago (Ended: 2012)
- Current status: Redirects to www.synopsys.com

Koders was a search engine for open source code. It enabled software developers to easily search and browse source code in thousands of projects posted at hundreds of open source repositories.

On April 28, 2008, it was announced that Black Duck Software would acquire the Koders assets and technologies although the Koders website will remain as a free resource.

On May 19, 2009, Black Duck Software announced that projects from the Microsoft CodePlex open source project hosting site will now be fed automatically into Black Duck's open source KnowledgeBase repository. The projects also will be searchable through Black Duck's Koders.com.

Koders announced on September 9, 2009, that their search engine now exceed 2.4 billion lines of code; a 210% increase since April 2008.

Black Duck Software announced on October 25, 2012, the merge of Koders with Ohloh Code.

== Plug-ins ==
In addition to their web-based search engine, Koders provided a plug-in for the IDE Eclipse and an add-in for Microsoft Visual Studio. A plug-in was also included within Code::Blocks.

== See also ==
- Google Code Search
- Krugle
- Open Hub
