= International Journal of Computer Mathematics =

- Discipline: Mathematics, Computer science
- Language: English
- Edited by: Abdul Khaliq, Choi Hong Lai, Qin (Tim) Sheng

Publication details
- History: 1964–present
- Publisher: Taylor & Francis
- Frequency: Monthly

Standard abbreviations
- ISO 4: Int. J. Comput. Math.

Indexing
- ISSN: 0020-7160

Links
- Journal homepage

The International Journal of Computer Mathematics is a monthly peer-reviewed scientific journal covering numerical analysis and scientific computing. It was established in 1964 and is published by Taylor & Francis. The editors-in-chief are Choi-Hong Lai (University of Greenwich), Abdul Khaliq (Middle Tennessee State University), and Qin (Tim) Sheng (Baylor University). The collaborative sister journal International Journal of Computer Mathematics: Computer Systems Theory, covering the theory of computing and computer systems was established in 2016.

== Abstracting and indexing ==
The journal is abstracted and indexed in the Science Citation Index Expanded, MathSciNet, and Scopus. According to the Journal Citation Reports, the journal has a 2018 impact factor of 1.196.
