= Philip Hazel =

British computer programmer

- Born: England
- Education: Ph.D. Applied mathematics
- Alma mater: University of Cambridge, 1970
- Occupation: Programmer
- Employer: Retired
- Known for: Exim, PCRE
- Website: quercite.dx.am

Philip Hazel is a computer programmer best known for writing the Exim mail transport agent in 1995 and the PCRE regular expression library in 1997.

He did undergraduate studies at the University of Cape Town and went to the University of Cambridge for his PhD. He arrived in Cambridge in 1967 where he was employed by the University of Cambridge Computing Service until he retired at the end of September 2007. In 2009 Hazel wrote an autobiographical memoir about his computing career which he updated in 2017.

Hazel is also known for his typesetting software, in particular "Philip's Music Writer", as well as programs to turn a simple markup into a subset of DocBook XML for use in the Exim manual, and to produce PostScript from this XML.

== Published works ==
- Hazel, Philip (2001). Exim: the Mail Transfer Agent. O'Reilly Media. ISBN 9780596000981. OCLC 54115766.
- Hazel, Philip (2007) [2003]. The Exim SMTP Mail Server (2 ed.). UIT Cambridge. ISBN 9780954452971. OCLC 148721785. Archived from the original on 8 March 2022.
- Hazel, Philip (2017) [2009]. "From Punched Cards To Flat Screens - A Technical Autobiography" (PDF) (2 ed.).
