= Krugle =

Search engine for open source code

- Owner: Aragon Consulting Group
- Current status: active

Krugle is a search engine that allows computer programmers and other developers to search open source repositories to locate open source code, and quickly share the code with other programmers on the internet. It finished its beta phase and went live on June 14, 2006.

The engine searches Apache, JavaDocs, SourceForge, and Wikipedia, amongst other sources. Repositories can be browsed, as well as project overviews being available.

Plugins to assist user searches are available for Mozilla Firefox and Internet Explorer, as well as user tools such as bookmarking and tagging.

On February 17, 2009, it was announced that Aragon Consulting Group would acquire the Krugle assets and technologies although the Krugle website would remain as a free resource.

== See also ==
- Koders
- Ohloh
