= Damerau =

Damerau is a surname. Notable people with the surname include:

- Dietmar Damerau (1935–2011), German artist
- Frederick J. Damerau (1931–2009), American researcher on natural language processing and data mining
  - Damerau–Levenshtein distance

Damerau is also the former German name of Dąbrowa Człuchowska, a town in northern Poland
