= Ontology merging =

Ontology merging defines the act of bringing together two conceptually divergent ontologies or the instance data associated to two ontologies. This is similar to work in database merging (schema matching). This merging process can be performed in a number of ways, manually, semi automatically, or automatically. Manual ontology merging although ideal is extremely labour-intensive and current research attempts to find semi or entirely automated techniques to merge ontologies. These techniques are statistically driven often taking into account similarity of concepts and raw similarity of instances through textual string metrics and semantic knowledge. These techniques are similar to those used in information integration employing string metrics from open source similarity libraries.

== See also ==
- Ontology mapping
- Ontology-based data integration
