= String-to-string correction problem =

In computer science, the string-to-string correction problem refers to determining the minimum cost sequence of edit operations necessary to change one string into another (i.e., computing the shortest edit distance). Each type of edit operation has its own cost value. A single edit operation may be changing a single symbol of the string into another (cost W_{C}), deleting a symbol (cost W_{D}), or inserting a new symbol (cost W_{I}).

If all edit operations have the same unit costs (W_{C} = W_{D} = W_{I} = 1), the problem is the same as computing the Levenshtein distance of two strings.

Several algorithms exist to provide an efficient way to determine string distance and specify the minimum number of transformation operations required. Such algorithms are particularly useful for delta creation operations where something is stored as a set of differences relative to a base version. This allows several versions of a single object to be stored much more efficiently than storing them separately. This holds true even for single versions of several objects if they do not differ greatly, or anything in between. Notably, such difference algorithms are used in molecular biology to provide some measure of kinship between different kinds of organisms based on the similarities of their macromolecules (such as proteins or DNA).

== Extension ==
The extended variant of the problem includes a new type of edit operation: swapping any two adjacent symbols, with a cost of W_{S}.

This version can be solved in polynomial time under certain restrictions on edit operation costs.

Robert A. Wagner (1975) showed that the general problem is NP-complete. In particular, he proved that when W_{I} < W_{C} = W_{D} = ∞ and 0 < W_{S} < ∞ (or equivalently, changing and deletion are not permitted), the problem is NP-complete.
