= Information integration =

Cohesive synthesis of information

Information integration (II) is the merging of information from heterogeneous sources with differing conceptual, contextual and typographical representations. It is used in data mining and consolidation of data from unstructured or semi-structured resources. Typically, information integration refers to textual representations of knowledge but is sometimes applied to rich media content. Information fusion, a related term, involves the combination of information into a new set of information in order to reduce redundancy and uncertainty.

Examples of technologies available to integrate information include deduplication and string metrics, which allow the detection of similar text in different data sources by fuzzy matching. Other methods rely on causal estimates of the outcomes based on a model of the sources.

== See also ==
- Data fusion
- Data integration
- Image fusion
- Sensor fusion
