= Time Warp Edit Distance =

In the data analysis of time series, Time Warp Edit Distance (TWED) is a measure of similarity (or dissimilarity) between pairs of discrete time series, controlling the relative distortion of the time units of the two series using the physical notion of elasticity. In comparison to other distance measures, (e.g. DTW (dynamic time warping) or LCS (longest common subsequence problem)), TWED is a metric. Its computational time complexity is $O(n^2)$, but can be drastically reduced in some specific situations by using a corridor to reduce the search space. Its memory space complexity can be reduced to $O(n)$. It was first proposed in 2009 by P.-F. Marteau.

== Definition ==
$$\delta_{\lambda,\nu}(A^p_1,B^q_1) = Min
\begin{cases}
\delta_{\lambda,\nu}(A^{p-1}_1,B^q_1) + \Gamma(a^{'}_p \to \Lambda) & \rm{delete \ in \ A} \\
\delta_{\lambda,\nu}(A^{p-1}_1,B^{q-1}_1) + \Gamma(a^{'}_p \to b^{'}_q) & \rm{match \ or \ substitution}\\
\delta_{\lambda,\nu}(A^{p}_1,B^{q-1}_1) + \Gamma(\Lambda \to b^{'}_q) & \rm{delete \ in \ B}
\end{cases}$$
whereas

$\Gamma(\alpha^{'}_p \to \Lambda) = d_{LP}(a^{'}_{p}, a^{'}_{p-1}) + \nu \cdot (t_{a_p} - t_{a_{p-1}}) + \lambda$
$\Gamma(\alpha^{'}_p \to b^{'}_q) = d_{LP}(a^{'}_p, b^{'}_q) + d_{LP}(a^{'}_{p-1}, b^{'}_{q-1}) + \nu \cdot (|t_{a_p} - t_{b_q}| + |t_{a_{p-1}} - t_{b_{q-1}}|)$
$\Gamma(\Lambda \to b^{'}_q) = d_{LP}(b^{'}_{p}, b^{'}_{p-1}) + \nu \cdot (t_{b_q} - t_{b_{q-1}}) + \lambda$

Whereas the recursion $\delta_{\lambda,\nu}$ is initialized as:
$\delta_{\lambda,\nu}(A^0_1,B^0_1) = 0,$
$\delta_{\lambda,\nu}(A^0_1,B^j_1) = \infty\ \rm{for\ }j \ge 1$
$\delta_{\lambda,\nu}(A^i_1,B^0_1) = \infty\ \rm{for\ }i \ge 1$
with $a'_0 = b'_0 = 0$

=== Implementations ===
An implementation of the TWED algorithm in C with a Python wrapper is available at

TWED is also implemented into the Time Series Subsequence Search Python package (TSSEARCH for short) available at .

An R implementation of TWED has been integrated into the TraMineR, a R package for mining, describing and visualizing sequences of states or events, and more generally discrete sequence data.

Additionally, cuTWED is a CUDA- accelerated implementation of TWED which uses an improved algorithm due to G. Wright (2020). This method is linear in memory and massively parallelized. cuTWED is written in CUDA C/C++, comes with Python bindings, and also includes Python bindings for Marteau's reference C implementation.

==== Python ====
import numpy as np


def dlp(A, B, p=2):
    cost = np.sum(np.power(np.abs(A - B), p))
    return np.power(cost, 1 / p)


def twed(A, timeSA, B, timeSB, nu, _lambda):
    """Compute Time Warp Edit Distance (TWED) for given time series A and B."""
    # [distance, DP] = TWED(A, timeSA, B, timeSB, lambda, nu)
    # 
    # A      := Time series A (e.g. [ 10 2 30 4])
    # timeSA := Time stamp of time series A (e.g. 1:4)
    # B      := Time series B
    # timeSB := Time stamp of time series B
    # lambda := Penalty for deletion operation
    # nu     := Elasticity parameter - nu >=0 needed for distance measure
    # Reference :
    #    Marteau, P.; F. (2009). "Time Warp Edit Distance with Stiffness Adjustment for Time Series Matching".
    #    IEEE Transactions on Pattern Analysis and Machine Intelligence. 31 (2): 306–318. arXiv:cs/0703033
    #    http://people.irisa.fr/Pierre-Francois.Marteau/

    # Check if input arguments
    if len(A) != len(timeSA):
        print("The length of A is not equal length of timeSA")
        return None, None

    if len(B) != len(timeSB):
        print("The length of B is not equal length of timeSB")
        return None, None

    if nu < 0:
        print("nu is negative")
        return None, None

    # Add padding
    A = np.array([0] + list(A))
    timeSA = np.array([0] + list(timeSA))
    B = np.array([0] + list(B))
    timeSB = np.array([0] + list(timeSB))

    n = len(A)
    m = len(B)
    # Dynamical programming
    DP = np.zeros((n, m))

    # Initialize DP matrix and set first row and column to infinity
    DP[0, :] = np.inf
    DP[:, 0] = np.inf
    DP[0, 0] = 0

    # Compute minimal cost
    for i in range(1, n):
        for j in range(1, m):
            # Calculate and save cost of various operations
            C = np.ones((3, 1)) * np.inf
            # Deletion in A
            C[0] = (
                DP[i - 1, j]
                + dlp(A[i - 1], A[i])
                + nu * (timeSA[i] - timeSA[i - 1])
                + _lambda
            )
            # Deletion in B
            C[1] = (
                DP[i, j - 1]
                + dlp(B[j - 1], B[j])
                + nu * (timeSB[j] - timeSB[j - 1])
                + _lambda
            )
            # Keep data points in both time series
            C[2] = (
                DP[i - 1, j - 1]
                + dlp(A[i], B[j])
                + dlp(A[i - 1], B[j - 1])
                + nu * (abs(timeSA[i] - timeSB[j]) + abs(timeSA[i - 1] - timeSB[j - 1]))
            )
            # Choose the operation with the minimal cost and update DP matrix
            DP[i, j] = np.min(C)
    distance = DP[n - 1, m - 1]
    return distance, DP

Backtracking, to find the most cost-efficient path:

def backtracking(DP):
    """Compute the most cost-efficient path."""
    # [ best_path ] = BACKTRACKING (DP)
    # DP := DP matrix of the TWED function

    x = np.shape(DP)
    i = x[0] - 1
    j = x[1] - 1

    # The indices of the paths are save in opposite direction
    # path = np.ones((i + j, 2 )) * np.inf;
    best_path = []

    steps = 0
    while i != 0 or j != 0:
        best_path.append((i - 1, j - 1))

        C = np.ones((3, 1)) * np.inf

        # Keep data points in both time series
        C[0] = DP[i - 1, j - 1]
        # Deletion in A
        C[1] = DP[i - 1, j]
        # Deletion in B
        C[2] = DP[i, j - 1]

        # Find the index for the lowest cost
        idx = np.argmin(C)

        if idx == 0:
            # Keep data points in both time series
            i = i - 1
            j = j - 1
        elif idx == 1:
            # Deletion in A
            i = i - 1
            j = j
        else:
            # Deletion in B
            i = i
            j = j - 1
        steps = steps + 1

    best_path.append((i - 1, j - 1))

    best_path.reverse()
    return best_path[1:]

==== MATLAB ====
function [distance, DP] = twed(A, timeSA, B, timeSB, lambda, nu)
    % [distance, DP] = TWED( A, timeSA, B, timeSB, lambda, nu )
    % Compute Time Warp Edit Distance (TWED) for given time series A and B
    %
    % A      := Time series A (e.g. [ 10 2 30 4])
    % timeSA := Time stamp of time series A (e.g. 1:4)
    % B      := Time series B
    % timeSB := Time stamp of time series B
    % lambda := Penalty for deletion operation
    % nu     := Elasticity parameter - nu >=0 needed for distance measure
    %
    % Code by: P.-F. Marteau - http://people.irisa.fr/Pierre-Francois.Marteau/
 
    % Check if input arguments
    if length(A) ~= length(timeSA)
        warning('The length of A is not equal length of timeSA')
        return
    end
 
    if length(B) ~= length(timeSB)
        warning('The length of B is not equal length of timeSB')
        return
    end
 
    if nu < 0
        warning('nu is negative')
        return
    end
    % Add padding
    A = [0 A];
    timeSA = [0 timeSA];
    B = [0 B];
    timeSB = [0 timeSB];
 
    % Dynamical programming
    DP = zeros(length(A), length(B));
 
    % Initialize DP Matrix and set first row and column to infinity
    DP(1, :) = inf;
    DP(:, 1) = inf;
    DP(1, 1) = 0;
 
    n = length(timeSA);
    m = length(timeSB);
    % Compute minimal cost
    for i = 2:n
        for j = 2:m
            cost = Dlp(A(i), B(j));
         
            % Calculate and save cost of various operations
            C = ones(3, 1) * inf;
         
            % Deletion in A
            C(1) = DP(i - 1, j) + Dlp(A(i - 1), A(i)) + nu * (timeSA(i) - timeSA(i - 1)) + lambda;
            % Deletion in B
            C(2) = DP(i, j - 1) + Dlp(B(j - 1), B(j)) + nu * (timeSB(j) - timeSB(j - 1)) + lambda;
            % Keep data points in both time series
            C(3) = DP(i - 1, j - 1) + Dlp(A(i), B(j)) + Dlp(A(i - 1), B(j - 1)) + ...
            nu * (abs(timeSA(i) - timeSB(j)) + abs(timeSA(i - 1) - timeSB(j - 1)));
         
            % Choose the operation with the minimal cost and update DP Matrix
            DP(i, j) = min(C);
        end
    end
 
    distance = DP(n, m);
 
    % Function to calculate euclidean distance
    function [cost] = Dlp(A, B)
        cost = sqrt(sum((A - B) .^ 2, 2));
    end
 
end

Backtracking, to find the most cost-efficient path:

function [path] = backtracking(DP)
    % [ path ] = BACKTRACKING ( DP )
    % Compute the most cost-efficient path
    % DP := DP matrix of the TWED function
 
    x = size(DP);
    i = x(1);
    j = x(2);
 
    % The indices of the paths are save in opposite direction
    path = ones(i + j, 2) * Inf;
 
    steps = 1;
    while (i ~= 1 || j ~= 1)
        path(steps, :) = [i; j];
     
        C = ones(3, 1) * inf;
     
        % Keep data points in both time series
        C(1) = DP(i - 1, j - 1);
        % Deletion in A
        C(2) = DP(i - 1, j);
        % Deletion in B
        C(3) = DP(i, j - 1);
     
        % Find the index for the lowest cost
        [~, idx] = min(C);
     
        switch idx
            case 1
                % Keep data points in both time series
                i = i - 1;
                j = j - 1;
            case 2
                % Deletion in A
                i = i - 1;
                j = j;
            case 3
                % Deletion in B
                i = i;
                j = j - 1;
        end
        steps = steps + 1;
    end
    path(steps, :) = [i j];
 
    % Path was calculated in reversed direction.
    path = path(1:steps, :);
    path = path(end: - 1:1, :);
 
end
