= Dan Hirschberg =

American computer scientist

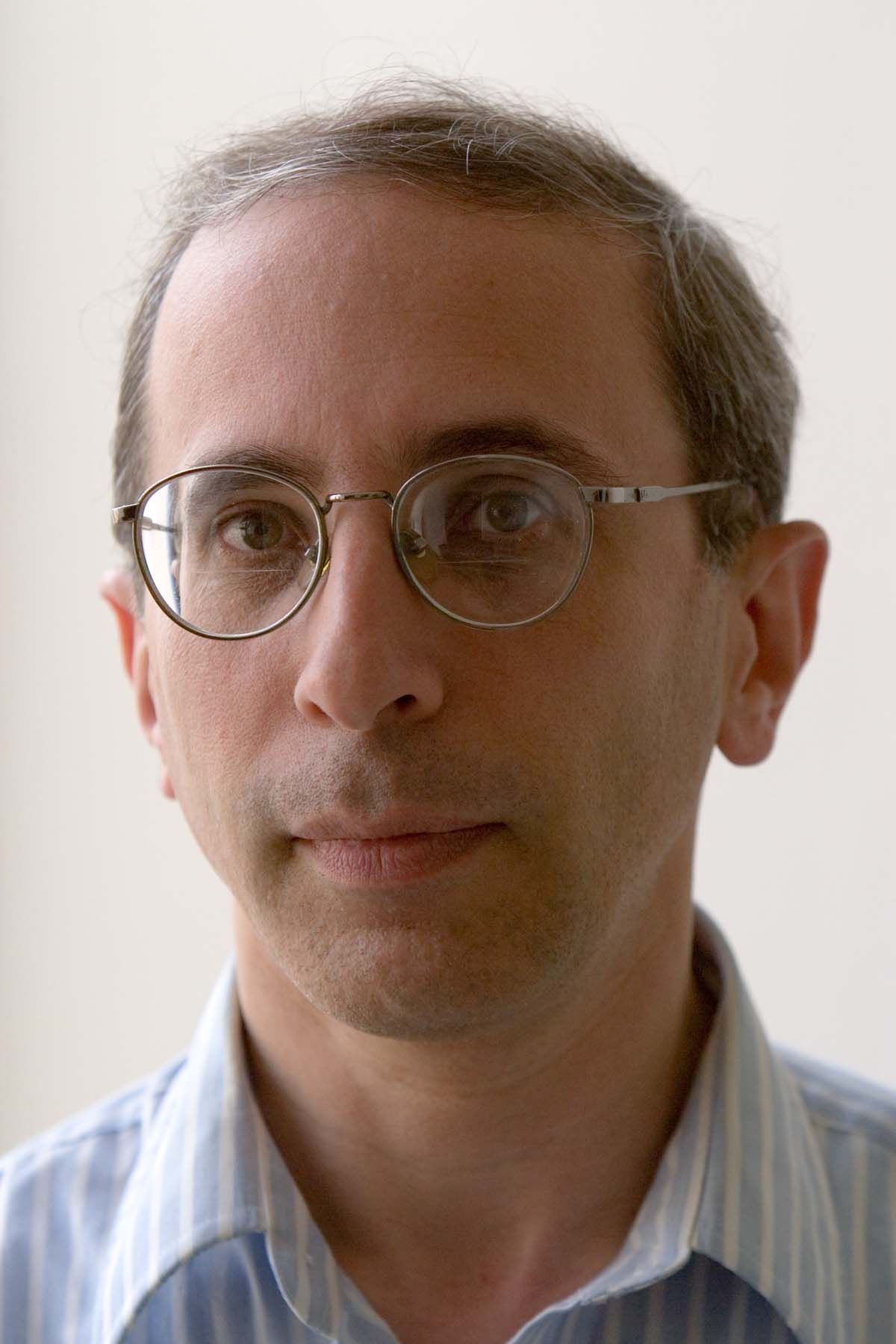
- Education: Princeton University
- Known for: Work on Hirschberg's algorithm
- Scientific career
- Workplaces: University of California, Irvine
- Doctoral students: Lawrence L. Larmore

Daniel S. Hirschberg is a full professor in Computer Science at University of California, Irvine. His research interests are in the theory of design and analysis of algorithms.

He obtained his PhD in computer science from Princeton University in 1975. He supervised the PhD dissertation of Lawrence L. Larmore.

He is best known for his 1975 and 1977 work on the longest common subsequence problem: Hirschberg's algorithm for this problem and for the related string edit distance problem solves it efficiently in only linear space. He is also known for his work in several other areas, including Distributed Algorithms. In Nancy Lynch's book Distributed Algorithms she gives details of an algorithm by Hirschberg and J. B. Sinclair for leader election in a synchronous ring. Lynch named this algorithm the HS algorithm, after its authors.

== Selected publications ==
- Hirschberg, D. S. (1975). "A linear space algorithm for computing maximal common subsequences". Communications of the ACM. 18 (6): 341–343. doi:10.1145/360825.360861. S2CID 207694727.
- Hirschberg, D. S. (1977). "Algorithms for the Longest Common Subsequence Problem". Journal of the ACM. 24 (4): 664–675. doi:10.1145/322033.322044. S2CID 11431150.
