= William E. Winkler =

American statistician (1946-2022)

William Erwin Winkler (November 11, 1946 – June 30, 2022) was an American statistician who spent most of his career at the U.S. Census Bureau. He is known for many contributions to the development of probabilistic methods for record linkage and the invention of the Jaro-Winkler distance for strings.

== Education and career ==
Winkler was born in Cincinnati, Ohio and. He obtained his B.S. in mathematics at the Michigan State University. He obtained his Ph.D. in probability theory at the Ohio State University under the supervision of Louis Sucheston. During this period, Winkler worked on Markov chains. After graduation, Winkler became an assistant professor at the University of Pittsburgh from 1974 to 1979. In 1980, Winkler joined the Energy Information Administration of the United States Department of Energy as a mathematical statistician and worked there until 1987, at which time he moved to the U.S. Census Bureau and rose to the rank of principal researcher. He led the Record Linkage and Machine Learning Research Group at the U.S. Census Bureau until 2019, when he retired. Winkler was an affiliate faculty member at the George Mason University since 2009.

== Bibliography ==
- Herzog, Thomas N.; Scheuren, Fritz J.; Winkler, William E. (2007). Data Quality and Record Linkage Techniques. Springer New York. doi:10.1007/0-387-69505-2. ISBN 978-0-387-69502-0.
