= Taras Vintsiuk =

Ukrainian cyberneticist (1939–2012)

Taras Vintsiuk Ukrainian: Тарас Климович Вінцюк
- Born: 10 March 1939; Kulchyn, Ukrainian SSR, USSR
- Died: 29 May 2012 (aged 73); Kyiv, Ukraine
- Education: Kyiv Polytechnic Institute
- Known for: Pattern recognition generative model
- Awards: Ukrainian State Prizes, IEEE Computer Pioneer Award
- Scientific career
- Fields: Cybernetics, pattern recognition, speech recognition
- Workplaces: Institute of Cybernetics, Kyiv
- Academic advisors: Victor Glushkov

Taras Klymovych Vintsiuk (sometimes also spelled as 'Vintsyuk'; Ukrainian: Тара́с Кли́мович Вінцю́к; 10 March 1939, Kulchyn – 29 May 2012, Kyiv) was a Ukrainian pioneer in pattern recognition theory. He authored fundamental works in the field of speech recognition, and was an initiator and organizer of the State R&D Program. He was the originator of the "pattern recognition generative model" research school. He served as founder and president (till 2012) of the Ukrainian Association for Information Processing and Pattern Recognition (UAsIPPR).

== Early life ==
Taras Vintsiuk was born on 10 March 1939 in Kulchyn, Volyn' oblast. In the postwar years he lived in an orphanage and later with relatives. In 1956 he graduated with a golden medal. In 1956–1961 he studied at the Kiev Polytechnic Institute, where he graduated with honors.

== Career ==
In 1962 he worked as an engineer. In 1988, he headed the Speech Science Department at Hlushkov Institute of Cybernetics and joined International Research and Training Center for Information Technologies and Systems in 1997.

=== Research and development ===
His widely applied generative model for pattern recognition was formulated and proposed in 1967. This approach, commonly known as Dynamic Time Warping (DTW), is used in the theory of speech and visual pattern recognition, and in text processing and non-linear process modeling in radio-physics and biology. A similar model, known as Hidden Markov Model (HMM), was originated in 1973 and is the most cited in the world.

Since the late 1960s, teams led by Vintsiuk developed speech recognition systems.

He authored more than 300 papers and two books. He was awarded the State Prize of Ukraine in 1988 and 1997 in the field of science and technology. Taras Vintsiuk is creator of the Pattern Computer concept that formed the basis of the National Scientific and Technical Program (2000–2010).

== Public activity ==
Vintsiuk was a member of many scientific societies, program committees and editorial boards of many conferences and research journals. He founded and headed the Ukrainian Association for Information Processing and Pattern Recognition (UAsIPPR). Beginning in 1992, he organized 10 international conferences on signal processing and pattern recognition "UkrObraz" and published the conference Proceedings. Beginning in 2004, Taras organized annual summer schools dedicated to speech science and technology.

Vintsiuk contributed numerous entries to the Encyclopedia of Modern Ukraine in the domain of cybernetics and computing.

== Sources ==
- Vintsyuk, T.K. "Speech discrimination by dynamic programming". Kibernetika, Vol. 4, pp. 81–88, Jan.-Feb. 1968
- Т. К. Винцюк. Анализ, распознавание и смысловая интерпретация речевых сигналов. – Киев. Наукова думка, 1987–261 стор.
- В. М. Глушков, Т. К. Винцюк, В. Г. Величко. "Говорящие" ЭВМ: речевой ввод и вывод информации. – Знание, 1975 – 61 стор.
- Вінцюк Т. К. Образний комп'ютер // Сучасні проблеми в комп'ютерних науках. Зб. наук. праць, Вид-во Нац. ун-ту "Львівська політехніка", Львів, 2000, с. 5–14
