= Gad Landau =

Israeli computer scientist

Gad M. Landau
- גד לנדאו
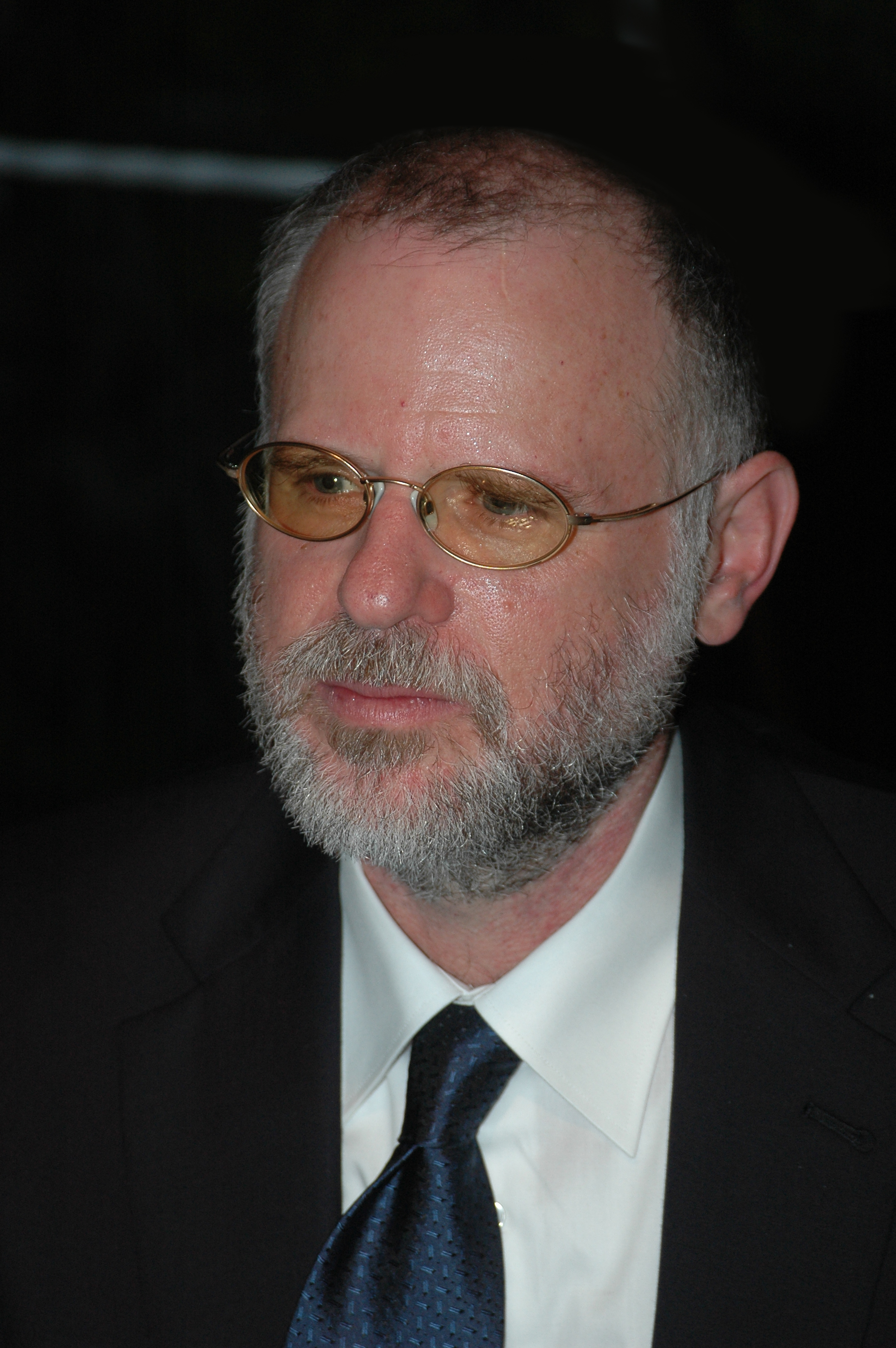
- Gad M. Landau
- Born: 24 September 1954 (age 72); Israel
- Education: Tel-Aviv University
- Known for: k-differences problem incremental sequence alignment
- Scientific career
- Fields: Theoretical computer science
- Workplaces: University of Haifa; NYU Polytechnic School of Engineering
- Thesis: String matching in erroneous input (1987)
- Doctoral advisor: Uzi Vishkin

Gad Menahem Landau (Hebrew: גד מנחם לנדאו; born 1954) is an Israeli computer scientist noted for his contributions to combinatorial pattern matching and string algorithms and is the founding department chair of the Computer Science Department at the University of Haifa.

He has coauthored over 100 peer-reviewed scientific papers.

== Academic background ==
Landau received his Ph.D. in Computer Science from Tel Aviv University in 1987. From 1988 to the present he has held positions as assistant, associate, and research professor at Polytechnic University in New York (now called NYU Polytechnic School of Engineering, New York University). In 1995, Landau joined the faculty of the University of Haifa, where he founded the Department of Computer Science and was the first department head. In 2006, Landau was promoted to his current position of full professor at the University of Haifa.

== Research ==
Landau's research interests focus on string algorithms, data structures, computational biology, and parallel computation. He has made several profound contributions to these areas, even in the early days of his scientific career. His Ph.D. thesis, supervised by Prof. Uzi Vishkin, includes the fundamental text-book solution for the k-differences problem, solving one of the major open problems in the area at the time. His solution was the first to combine suffix trees and lowest common ancestor queries, and has since inspired many extensions of this technique to other problems.

The footprints of Landau's research can be found in almost every subarea of string algorithms, including his foundational work on dynamic programming algorithms for the edit distance problem, his numerous papers on modeling digitized images and 2D matching, incremental sequence alignment, and recently, his work on jumbled pattern matching and compressed text algorithms. He was instrumental in the application of pattern matching techniques to the area of computational biology, working on problems in several diverse areas such as DNA and RNA comparison, clustering, haplotype inference, protein secondary structure prediction, and tandem repeats.

Landau's research has been continually funded by the U.S. National Science Foundation, the Israel Science Foundation, and the U.S.-Israel Binational Science Foundation. He received the IBM Faculty award, and was awarded funding from the DFG and Yahoo. Landau co-chaired the International Symposium on Combinatorial Pattern Matching in both 2001 and 2008. He serves on the editorial board of Journal of Discrete Algorithms, and served as a guest editor for TCS and Discrete Applied Mathematics. He has served on numerous program committees for international conferences, most recently, International Conference on Language and Automata Theory and Applications (LATA), International Symposium on String Processing and Information Retrieval (SPIRE), International Symposium on Algorithms and Computation (ISAAC), Annual Symposium on Combinatorial Pattern Matching (CPM), Workshop on Algorithms in Bioinformatics (WABI), International Workshop on Combinatorial Algorithms (IWOCA), and Brazilian Symposium on Bioinformatics (BSB).

== Academic activities ==
Landau has been an active member on academic committees, including committees that advise and supervise the academic activity in newly founded computer science departments in Israel. He founded several academic projects at the University of Haifa, most notably the Etgar undergraduate program for highly talented high school students throughout the north of Israel. Apart from these, Landau was also involved in community and civic activities, and served as a member of the Haifa city council from 2008 until 2013.
