= List of analyses of categorical data =

This is a list of statistical procedures which can be used for the analysis of categorical data, also known as data on the nominal scale and as categorical variables.

== General tests ==
- Bowker's test of symmetry
- Categorical distribution, general model
- Chi-squared test
- Cochran–Armitage test for trend
- Cochran–Mantel–Haenszel statistics
- Correspondence analysis
- Cronbach's alpha
- Diagnostic odds ratio
- G-test
- Generalized estimating equations
- Generalized linear models
- Krichevsky–Trofimov estimator
- Kuder–Richardson Formula 20
- Linear discriminant analysis
- Multinomial distribution
- Multinomial logit
- Multinomial probit
- Multiple correspondence analysis
- Odds ratio
- Poisson regression
- Powered partial least squares discriminant analysis
- Qualitative variation
- Randomization test for goodness of fit
- Relative risk
- Stratified analysis
- Tetrachoric correlation
- Uncertainty coefficient
- Wald test

== Binomial data ==
- Bernstein inequalities (probability theory)
- Binomial regression
- Binomial proportion confidence interval
- Chebyshev's inequality
- Chernoff bound
- Gauss's inequality
- Markov's inequality
- Rule of succession
- Rule of three (medicine)
- Vysochanskiï–Petunin inequality

== 2 × 2 tables ==
- Chi-squared test
- Diagnostic odds ratio
- Fisher's exact test
- G-test
- Odds ratio
- Relative risk
- McNemar's test
- Yates's correction for continuity

== Measures of association ==
- Aickin's α
- Andres and Marzo's delta
- Bangdiwala's B
- Bennett, Alpert, and Goldstein’s S
- Brennan and Prediger's κ
- Coefficient of colligation - Yule's Y
- Coefficient of consistency
- Coefficient of raw agreement
- Conger's Kappa
- Contingency coefficient – Pearson's C
- Cramér's V
- Dice's coefficient
- Fleiss' kappa
- Goodman and Kruskal's lambda
- Guilford’s G
- Gwet's AC1
- Hanssen–Kuipers discriminant
- Heidke skill score
- Jaccard index
- Janson and Vegelius' C
- Kappa statistics
- Klecka's tau
- Krippendorff's Alpha
- Kuipers performance index
- Matthews correlation coefficient
- Phi coefficient
- Press' Q
- Renkonen similarity index
- Prevalence adjusted bias adjusted kappa
- Sakoda's adjusted Pearson's C
- Scott's Pi
- Sørensen similarity index
- Stouffer's Z
- True skill statistic
- Tschuprow's T
- Tversky index
- Von Eye's kappa

== Categorical manifest variables as latent variable ==
- Latent variable model
  - Item response theory
    - Rasch model
  - Latent class analysis

== See also ==
- Categorical distribution
