= DPQ =

DPQ or Dpq can refer to:

- $Dpq$, which represents the Sheffer stroke or NAND operation in Polish notation
- Dongpo District, a district of Meishan, Sichuan province, China; see List of administrative divisions of Sichuan
- $D_{PQ}$ or Prevosti's distance, a way of measuring distance between probability distributions; see Qualitative variation#Prevosti’s distance
