= Without a Clue =

1988 British comedy film by Thom Eberhardt

- Original film poster
- Directed by: Thom Eberhardt
- Written by: Larry Strawther; Gary Murphy
- Produced by: Marc Stirdivant
- Starring: Michael Caine; Ben Kingsley; Jeffrey Jones; Lysette Anthony; Paul Freeman
- Cinematography: Alan Hume
- Edited by: Peter Tanner
- Music by: Henry Mancini
- Production company: ITC Entertainment Group
- Distributed by: Orion Pictures (United States); Rank Film Distributors (United Kingdom)
- Release date: October 21, 1988
- Running time: 107 minutes
- Country: United Kingdom
- Language: English
- Budget: $8.5-10 million
- Box office: $8.5 million

Without a Clue is a 1988 British comedy film directed by Thom Eberhardt and starring Michael Caine and Ben Kingsley. It is based on Sir Arthur Conan Doyle's characters from the Sherlock Holmes stories but, in this version, the roles are reversed: Dr. John Watson is the brilliant detective, while "Sherlock Holmes" is an actor hired to pose as the detective so that Watson can protect his reputation as a physician.

== Plot ==
Sherlock Holmes is a fictional creation, the central character in a series of short stories written by Dr John Watson and published in The Strand Magazine. Watson conceives of Holmes as a way for him to solve crimes incognito, as he views detective work as merely a hobby and does not want the attention it would bring to his medical career. However, when the reading public demand to actually see Holmes, Watson hires a washed-up stage actor, Reginald Kincaid, to play the part. Kincaid slowly learns to memorise the doctor's exacting, detailed instructions every step of the way and manages to convince the public that he is indeed Holmes.

After a major case, Kincaid oversteps his boundaries with Watson, who fires him. Realising that he should have been honest from the start, Watson decides to write Holmes out of his stories and replace him with a new character, "The Crime Doctor", based on himself. Unfortunately, the idea of a physician rather than a detective solving crimes is rejected by the public, and when Watson attempts to investigate a crime of arson at a paper warehouse, he quickly finds that no one is willing to share information or co-operate with his inquiries.

Soon after, the British government contacts Watson, requesting that Holmes solve a major theft. A government mint recently reported the disappearance of printing plates for £5 banknotes, with the printing supervisor, Peter Giles, having gone missing on the night of the robbery. The counterfeiting of these notes would cause the inevitable collapse of the economy if they were allowed to circulate. Watson is therefore forced to hunt down a drunken Kincaid and clean him up before accepting the case.

Scotland Yard's Inspector Lestrade is jealous of Holmes and refuses to let him or Watson participate in the official investigation. Rather than relying on the regular police, therefore, Watson turns to the twelve-year-old street urchin, Wiggins, the leader of a street gang that he calls the "Baker Street Irregulars", paying them to keep an eye on people and locate evidence. One line of enquiry leads Watson to the printer's daughter, Leslie, whom he and the womanising Holmes invite back to their quarters to recover from the shock of false evidence of her father's death.

Watson and Holmes discover that the master criminal Professor James Moriarty is behind the theft and find him on the docks while receiving a consignment of printing ink. Watson is apparently killed and Holmes is left to rely on himself, using everything he has learned to solve the case. The trail takes him to an abandoned theatre where the forgeries are being printed. There, he discovers that Watson is still alive after all and the two team up to defeat Moriarty for good and recover the missing plates. In the process, Leslie turns out to be an imposter in the pay of Moriarty.

When they return to 221B Baker Street, Holmes announces to a reception committee of reporters that he intends to retire and gives full credit to the qualities of his partner Watson. For his part, Watson assures the public that, far from this being the end, the team of Sherlock Holmes and Dr. John Watson will continue their detective work from now on as friends.

== Cast ==
- Michael Caine as Sherlock Holmes / Reginald Kincaid
- Ben Kingsley as Dr. John Watson
- Jeffrey Jones as Inspector George Lestrade
- Lysette Anthony as fake Leslie Giles
- Paul Freeman as Professor James Moriarty
- Nigel Davenport as Lord Smithwick
- Pat Keen as Mrs. Hudson
- Peter Cook as Norman Greenhough
- Tim Killick as Sebastian Moran
- Matthew Savage as Wiggins
- John Warner as Peter Giles
- Matthew Sim as real Lesley Giles
- Harold Innocent as Lord Mayor Gerald Fitzwalter Johnson
- George Sweeney as John Clay
- Murray Ewan as Archie
- Gregor Fisher as Bobby at Warehouse
- Jennifer Guy as Christabel, the Lord Mayor's daughter

== Production ==
=== Writing ===
Written by Gary Murphy and Larry Strawther, two devoted Sherlockians, the film originally had the working titles The Imposter of Baker Street and Sherlock and Me. The script was filled with numerous Doyle references, some of which were excised from the final film to make it more accessible. A reference from the real world that survived was the character of Norman Greenhough, based on Herbert Greenhough Smith, editor of The Strand Magazine, whose faith in the Holmes/Watson characters brought fame and fortune to both writer and periodical.

== Reception ==
The film was poorly reviewed during its initial release, while later reviews have been more positive. On Rotten Tomatoes, the film has an approval rating of 62% based on 13 reviews, with an average rating of 5.6/10. Audiences surveyed by CinemaScore gave the film a grade B+ on scale of A to F.

Roger Ebert gave the film two stars out of four on the grounds that the "amusing premise" that Holmes is in fact a third-rate actor hired by Watson to play the role is not enough to carry the film. This was echoed by The Monthly Film Bulletin's judgement that "If this premise were to be workable, it would require the casting of an actor who could actually pass as the genuine Holmes. As it is, we are simply given a buffoon." Dave Kehr, writing for the Chicago Tribune, agreed that a "Sherlock Holmes movie can be many things, but stupid isn't one of them. Still, there's no other way to consider Without a Clue, a mystery-comedy so klutzy that it tips one of its few surprises in the credit list."

Vincent Canby, writing for The New York Times, stated that Without A Clue was "an appallingly witless sendup of the Sherlock Holmes–Dr. Watson stories". Variety conceded that the film "generates a few laughs and smiles, but of a markedly mild nature and most of them provoked by the shrewdly judged antics of the two stars." Harvey O'Brien thought the film seemed "more like a television production", although the choice of actors for the main characters convincingly addresses "the artificiality of the Holmes mythos" and "presents a unique redemption of the Watson figure".

The film won the 1989 Special Jury Prize at the Festival du Film Policier de Cognac.
