= Dice-Sørensen coefficient =

Statistic used for comparing the similarity of two samples

The Dice-Sørensen coefficient is a statistic used to gauge the similarity of two samples. It was independently developed by the botanists Lee Raymond Dice and Thorvald Sørensen, who published in 1945 and 1948 respectively.

== Name ==
The index is known by several other names, especially Sørensen–Dice index, Sørensen index and Dice's coefficient. Other variations include the "similarity coefficient" or "index", such as Dice similarity coefficient (DSC). Common alternate spellings for Sørensen are Sorenson, Soerenson and Sörenson, and all three can also be seen with the –sen ending (the Danish letter ø is phonetically equivalent to the German/Swedish ö, which can be written as oe in ASCII).

Other names include:

- F1 score
- Czekanowski's binary (non-quantitative) index
- Measure of genetic similarity
- Zijdenbos similarity index, referring to a 1994 paper of Zijdenbos et al.

== Formula ==
Sørensen's original formula was intended to be applied to discrete data. Given two sets, X and Y, it is defined as

$$DSC =  \frac{2 |X \cap Y|}{|X| + |Y|}$$

where |X| and |Y| are the cardinalities of the two sets (i.e. the number of elements in each set). The Sørensen index equals twice the number of elements common to both sets divided by the sum of the number of elements in each set. Equivalently, the index is the size of the intersection as a fraction of the average size of the two sets.

When applied to Boolean data, using the definition of true positive (TP), false positive (FP), and false negative (FN), it can be written as

$$DSC = \frac{2 \mathit{TP}}{2 \mathit{TP} + \mathit{FP} + \mathit{FN}}$$.

It is different from the Jaccard index which only counts true positives once in both the numerator and denominator. DSC is the quotient of similarity and ranges between 0 and 1. It can be viewed as a similarity measure over sets.

Similarly to the Jaccard index, the set operations can be expressed in terms of vector operations over binary vectors a and b:

$$s_v = \frac{2 | \bf{a} \cdot \bf{b} |}{| \bf{a} |^2 + | \bf{b} |^2}$$

which gives the same outcome over binary vectors and also gives a more general similarity metric over vectors in general terms.

For sets X and Y of keywords used in information retrieval, the coefficient may be defined as twice the shared information (intersection) over the sum of cardinalities:

When taken as a string similarity measure, the coefficient may be calculated for two strings, x and y using bigrams as follows:

$$s = \frac{2 n_t}{n_x + n_y}$$

where n_{t} is the number of character bigrams found in both strings, n_{x} is the number of bigrams in string x and n_{y} is the number of bigrams in string y. For example, to calculate the similarity between:

night
nacht

We would find the set of bigrams in each word:

{ni,ig,gh,ht}
{na,ac,ch,ht}

Each set has four elements, and the intersection of these two sets has only one element: ht.

Inserting these numbers into the formula, we calculate, s = (2 · 1) / (4 + 4) = 0.25.

=== Continuous Dice Coefficient ===
For a discrete (binary) ground truth $A$ and continuous measures $B$ in the interval [0,1], the following formula can be used:

$cDC = \frac{2 |A \cap B|}{c * |A| + |B|}$

Where $|A \cap B| = \Sigma_i a_ib_i$ and $|B| = \Sigma_i b_i$

c can be computed as follows:

$c = \frac{\Sigma_i a_ib_i}{\Sigma_i a_i \operatorname{sign}{(b_i)}}$

If $\Sigma_i a_i \operatorname{sign}{(b_i)} = 0$ which means no overlap between A and B, c is set to 1 arbitrarily.

== Difference from Jaccard ==
This coefficient is not very different in form from the Jaccard index. In fact, both are equivalent in the sense that given a value for the Sørensen–Dice coefficient $S$, one can calculate the respective Jaccard index value $J$ and vice versa, using the equations $J=S/(2-S)$ and $S=2J/(1+J)$.

Since the Sørensen–Dice coefficient does not satisfy the triangle inequality, it can be considered a semimetric version of the Jaccard index.

The function ranges between zero and one, like Jaccard. Unlike Jaccard, the corresponding difference function

$$d(X, Y) = 1 -  \frac{2 | X \cap Y |}{| X | + | Y |}$$

is not a proper distance metric as it does not satisfy the triangle inequality. The simplest counterexample of this is given by the three sets $X=\{a\}$, $Y=\{b\}$ and $Z = X \cup Y = \{a, b\}$. We have $d(X,Y)=1$ and $d(X,Z)=d(Y,Z)=1/3$. To satisfy the triangle inequality, the sum of any two sides must be greater than or equal to that of the remaining side. However, $d(X, Z) + d(Y, Z) = 2/3 < 1 = d(X, Y)$.

== Applications ==
The Sørensen–Dice coefficient is useful for ecological community data (e.g. Looman & Campbell, 1960). Justification for its use is primarily empirical rather than theoretical (although it can be justified theoretically as the intersection of two fuzzy sets). As compared to Euclidean distance, the Sørensen distance retains sensitivity in more heterogeneous data sets and gives less weight to outliers. Recently the Dice score (and its variations, e.g. logDice taking a logarithm of it) has become popular in computer lexicography for measuring the lexical association score of two given words. logDice is also used as part of the Mash Distance for genome and metagenome distance estimation Finally, Dice is used in image segmentation, in particular for comparing algorithm output against reference masks in medical applications.

== Abundance version ==
The expression is easily extended to abundance instead of presence/absence of species. This quantitative version is known by several names:

- Quantitative Sørensen–Dice index
- Quantitative Sørensen index
- Quantitative Dice index
- Bray–Curtis similarity (1 minus the Bray-Curtis dissimilarity)
- Czekanowski's quantitative index
- Steinhaus index
- Pielou's percentage similarity
- Proportion of specific agreement or positive agreement

== See also ==
- Correlation
- F1 score
- Hellinger distance
- Jaccard index
- Hamming distance
- Mantel test
- Morisita's overlap index
- Overlap coefficient
- Renkonen similarity index
- Tversky index
- Universal adaptive strategy theory (UAST)
