= Herbert Greenhough Smith =

British writer

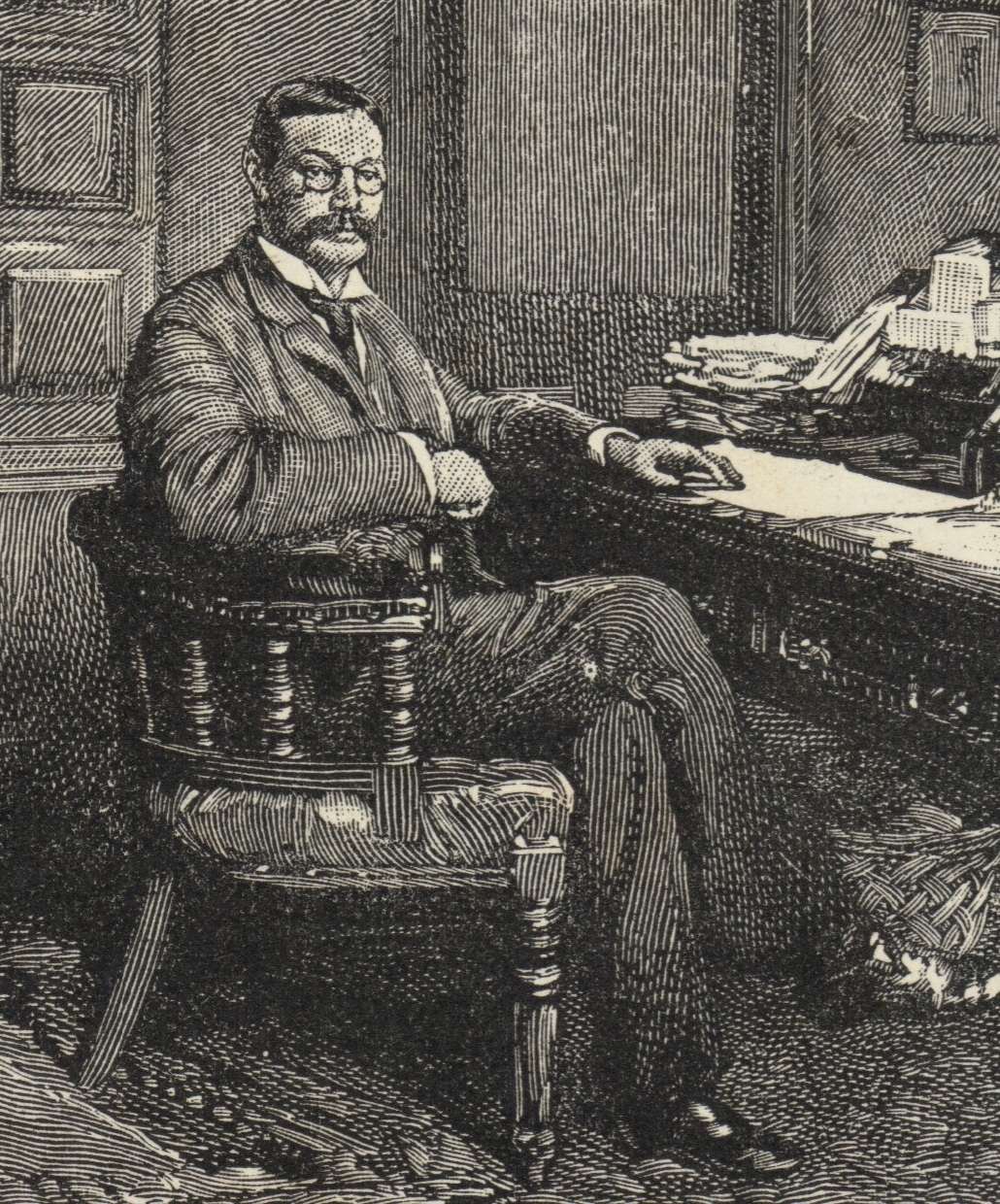
- Born: 1855; Stroud, England
- Died: 14 January 1935 (aged 80); London, England
- Occupations: Editor, Strand Magazine 1891–1930

Herbert Greenhough Smith (1855 – 14 January 1935) was the first editor of The Strand Magazine which published many of Arthur Conan Doyle's Sherlock Holmes stories. His active support and encouragement to Conan Doyle, and the magazine's vigorous promotion of the Sherlock Holmes character, had much to do with the character's success.

== Biography ==
Born in Stroud in 1855, the eldest of the eight children of Alfred Smith (1821–1896) and his wife Eleanor née Greenhough (1821–1896), Herbert was given his mother's maiden name as a middle name and subsequently used it as a double surname. He attended St. John's College, Cambridge where he achieved a B.A., before working briefly as a private tutor. He "gave this up for journalism" and by 1890 he was working for Temple Bar, "one of London's older and stodgier magazines". Herbert, who was known as 'Calamity Smith', was tall, lean, wore a pince-nez, distrusted emotion and chain smoked. He loved playing spelka (a forerunner of Lexicon, the word-making card game) and he was often to be found ensconced at a table at his club overlooking the Thames with Eille Norewood, the actor, R.D. Blumenfield, the editor of the Daily Express and Paul Verral, an orthopaedic surgeon.

Herbert first married Beatrice Elizabeth B. Harrison in 1885 when she was just 16 years of age, with whom he had one son, Cyril Herbert Greenhough Smith (1889–1924). Following Beatrice's death in 1897 at the age of 27, he married 18-year old Dorothy Vernon Muddock (born 1882), the daughter of James Edward Preston Muddock in 1900.

Smith began editing The Strand Magazine in 1890. He brought the idea of a new publication, filled with a mix of stories and articles complete in itself, to the attention of publisher George Newnes. Newnes was on the lookout for a new magazine, having been let down by his friend W.T. Stead. Newnes liked the idea and with the added proviso that there should be an illustration on every opening. The Strand Magazine made its first appearance in December 1890 though it was dated January 1891. Smith retired in 1930 but retained his Newnes directorship and continued to advise on policy. He died on 14 January 1935.

== Publications ==
He wrote the following articles in The Strand Magazine -

- Quixarvyn's Rival December 1891
- The Case of Roger Carboyne September 1892
- The Powder Mine December 1893
- Some Letters of Conan Doyle October 1930

He wrote the following books -

- The Chevalier Bayard
- A Court Duel
- Castle Sombras
- Odd Moments : Essays in Little
- Stranger than Fiction - Thrills of History
- The Romance of History
- What I Think - A Symposium on Books and Other Things by Famous Writers of Today (Editor)

== Screen portrayals ==
In the Sherlock Holmes spoof film Without a Clue the character played by Peter Cook called Norman Greenhough (who was publisher for the Holmes stories) was clearly based on Greenhough Smith.

He has also been portrayed on television, by Ralph Riach in Murder Rooms, and by Allan Corduner in The Strange Case of Sherlock Holmes and Arthur Conan Doyle (2005).
