= Cramér's V =

Statistical measure of association

In statistics, Cramér's V (sometimes referred to as Cramér's phi and denoted as φ_{c}) is a measure of association between two nominal variables, giving a value between 0 and +1 (inclusive). It is based on Pearson's chi-squared statistic and was published by Harald Cramér in 1946.

== Usage and interpretation ==
φ_{c} is the intercorrelation of two discrete variables and may be used with variables having two or more levels. φ_{c} is a symmetrical measure: it does not matter which variable we place in the columns and which in the rows. Also, the order of rows/columns does not matter, so φ_{c} may be used with nominal data types or higher (notably, ordered or numerical).

Cramér's V varies from 0 (corresponding to no association between the variables) to 1 (complete association) and can reach 1 only when each variable is completely determined by the other. It may be viewed as the association between two variables as a percentage of their maximum possible variation.

φ_{c}^{2} is the mean square canonical correlation between the variables.

In the case of a 2 × 2 contingency table Cramér's V is equal to the absolute value of Phi coefficient.

== Calculation ==
Let a sample of size n of the simultaneously distributed variables $A$ and $B$ for $i=1,\ldots,r; j=1,\ldots,k$ be given by the frequencies

$n_{ij}=$ number of times the values $(A_i,B_j)$ were observed.

The chi-squared statistic then is:

$$\chi^2=\sum_{i,j}\frac{(n_{ij}-\frac{n_{i.}n_{.j}}{n})^2}{\frac{n_{i.}n_{.j}}{n}}\;,$$

where $n_{i.}=\sum_jn_{ij}$ is the number of times the value $A_i$ is observed and $n_{.j}=\sum_in_{ij}$ is the number of times the value $B_j$ is observed.

Cramér's V is computed by taking the square root of the chi-squared statistic divided by the sample size and the minimum dimension minus 1:

$$V = \sqrt{\frac{\varphi^2}{\min(k - 1,r-1)}} = \sqrt{ \frac{\chi^2/n}{\min(k - 1,r-1)}}\;,$$

where:

- $\varphi$ is the phi coefficient.
- $\chi^2$ is derived from Pearson's chi-squared test
- $n$ is the grand total of observations and
- $k$ being the number of columns.
- $r$ being the number of rows.

The p-value for the significance of V is the same one that is calculated using the Pearson's chi-squared test.

The formula for the variance of V=φ_{c} is known.

In R, the function cramerV() from the package rcompanion calculates V using the chisq.test function from the stats package. In contrast to the function cramersV() from the lsr package, cramerV() also offers an option to correct for bias. It applies the correction described in the following section.

== Bias correction ==
Cramér's V can be a heavily biased estimator of its population counterpart and will tend to overestimate the strength of association. A bias correction, using the above notation, is given by

$\tilde V = \sqrt{\frac{\tilde\varphi^2}{\min(\tilde k - 1,\tilde r - 1)}}$

where

$\tilde\varphi^2 = \max\left(0,\varphi^2 - \frac{(k-1)(r-1)}{n-1}\right)$

and

$\tilde k = k - \frac{(k-1)^2}{n-1}$
$\tilde r = r - \frac{(r-1)^2}{n-1}$

Then $\tilde V$ estimates the same population quantity as Cramér's V but with typically much smaller mean squared error. The rationale for the correction is that under independence, $E[\varphi^2]=\frac{(k-1)(r-1)}{n-1}$.

== See also ==
Other measures of correlation for nominal data:

- The Percent Maximum Difference
- The phi coefficient
- Tschuprow's T
- The uncertainty coefficient
- The Lambda coefficient
- The Rand index
- Davies–Bouldin index
- Dunn index
- Jaccard index
- Fowlkes–Mallows index

Other related articles:

- Contingency table
- Effect size
- Cluster analysis § External evaluation
