= Variation ratio =

The variation ratio is a simple measure of statistical dispersion in nominal distributions; it is the simplest measure of qualitative variation.

It is defined as the proportion of cases which are not in the mode category:

$$\mathbf{v} := 1 - \frac{f_m}{N},$$

where f_{m} is the frequency (number of cases) of the mode, and N is the total number of cases. While a simple measure, it is notable in that some texts and guides suggest or imply that the dispersion of nominal measurements cannot be ascertained. It is defined for instance by (Freeman 1965).

Just as with the range or standard deviation, the larger the variation ratio, the more differentiated or dispersed the data are; and the smaller the variation ratio, the more concentrated and similar the data are.

== An example ==
A group which is 55% female and 45% male has a proportion of 0.55 female (the mode is 0.55), therefore its variation ratio is

$$\mathbf{v} = 1 - \frac{0.55}{1}=0.45,$$

Similarly, in a group of 100 people where 60 people like beer, 25 people like wine, and the rest (15) prefer cocktails, the variation ratio is

$$\mathbf{v} = 1 - \frac{60}{100}=0.4,$$

== See also ==
- Qualitative variation, for a number of other measures of dispersion in nominal variables
