= The Strand Magazine =

British monthly magazine

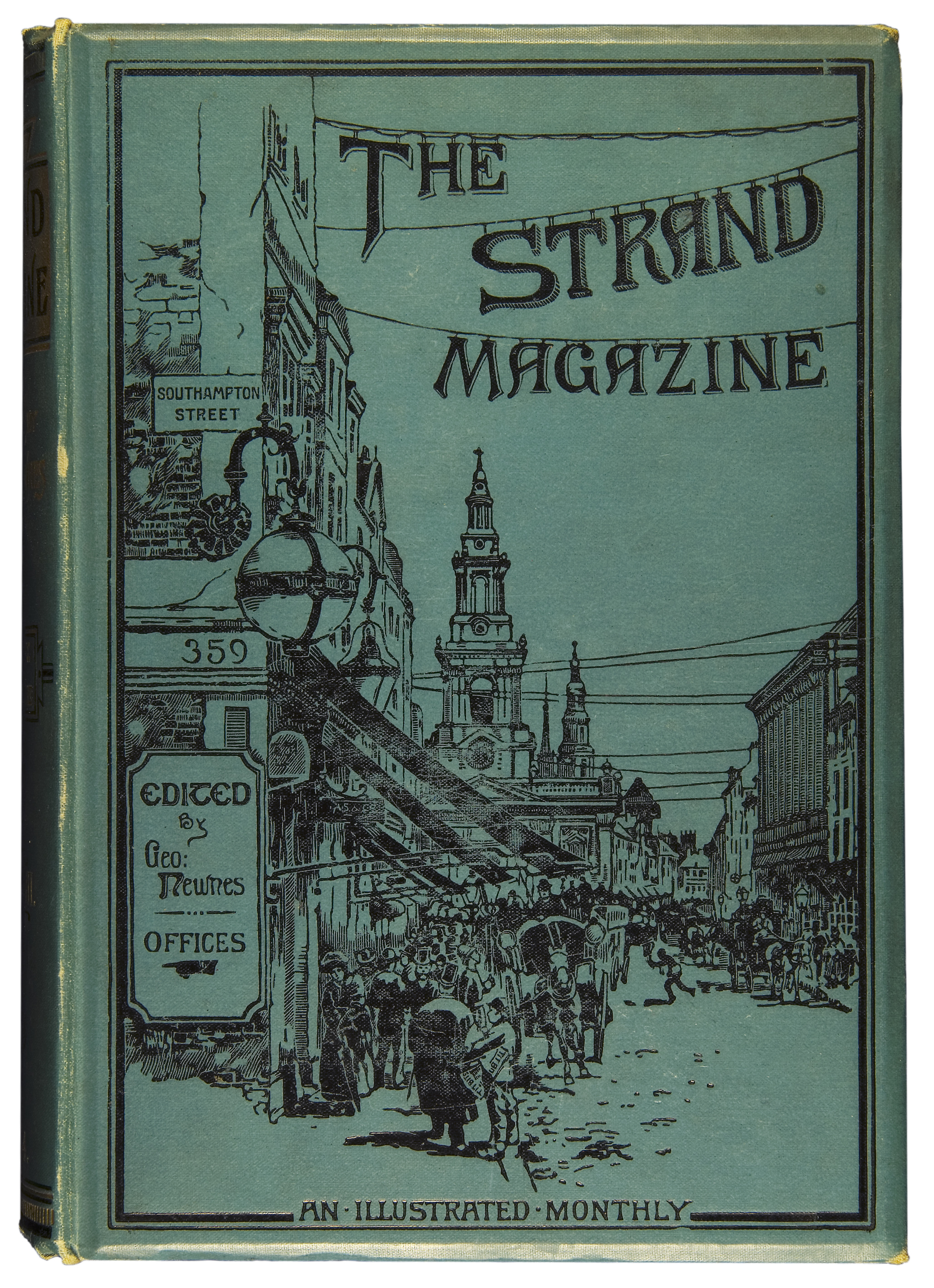
- Bound volume of The Strand Magazine for January–June 1894, featuring George Charles Haité's cover design
- Frequency: Monthly
- First issue: January 1891
- Final issue Number: March 1950; 711
- Company: George Newnes Ltd
- Country: United Kingdom
- Language: English

The Strand Magazine was a monthly British magazine founded by George Newnes, composed of short fiction and general interest articles. It was published in the United Kingdom from January 1891 to March 1950, running to 711 issues, though the first issue was on sale well before Christmas 1890. Its immediate popularity is evidenced by an initial sale of nearly 300,000. Sales increased in the early months, before settling down to a circulation of almost 500,000 copies a month, which lasted well into the 1930s.

It was edited by Herbert Greenhough Smith from 1891 to 1930. The popularity of Sherlock Holmes became widespread after the character first appeared in the magazine in 1891. The magazine's original offices were on Burleigh Street off The Strand, London. It was revived in 1998 as a quarterly magazine.

== Publication history ==
The Strand Magazine was founded by George Newnes in 1890, and its first edition was dated January 1891. The magazine's original offices were located on Burleigh Street, off the Strand, London. The first editor was Herbert Greenhough Smith, who remained the editor until 1930. The magazine published factual articles in addition to fictional short stories and series. It was targeted at a mass market readership. The initial price of an issue was sixpence, about half the typical rate for comparable titles at the time. Initial sales were around 300,000, and circulation soon rose to half a million.

The magazine also published a United States edition from February 1891 through February 1916. In its early years, the contents of the US edition were identical with those of the UK edition, though usually with a one-month time lag. As the years went on there were some differences in the contents of the two editions, reflecting fiction for which The Strand did not hold the US rights (such as The Return of Sherlock Holmes, which was commissioned by Collier's magazine) and non-fiction that would not interest most US readers (such as articles about personalities in the House of Commons). The circulation of the US edition was minimal in the early 1890s but was reported at 150,000 by 1898. The US edition was discontinued in 1916 due to logistical difficulties arising from World War I. The American edition was edited by J. Walter Smith.

The magazine format changed to the smaller digest size in October 1941. The Strand Magazine ceased publication in March 1950, forced out of the market by declining circulation and rising costs. Its last editor was Macdonald Hastings, distinguished war correspondent and later TV reporter and contributor to the Eagle boys' comic. In 1961, the magazine was briefly revived as The New Strand under the editorship of Noni Jabavu.

It was normally bound as six-monthly volumes, from January to June and July to December, but from the mid-1930s this varied, and the final volumes in the late 1940s ran from October to March and April to September, the final volume CXVIII (118) running from October 1949 to March 1950.

The magazine was revived in 1998 in the US (see below).

== Fiction ==
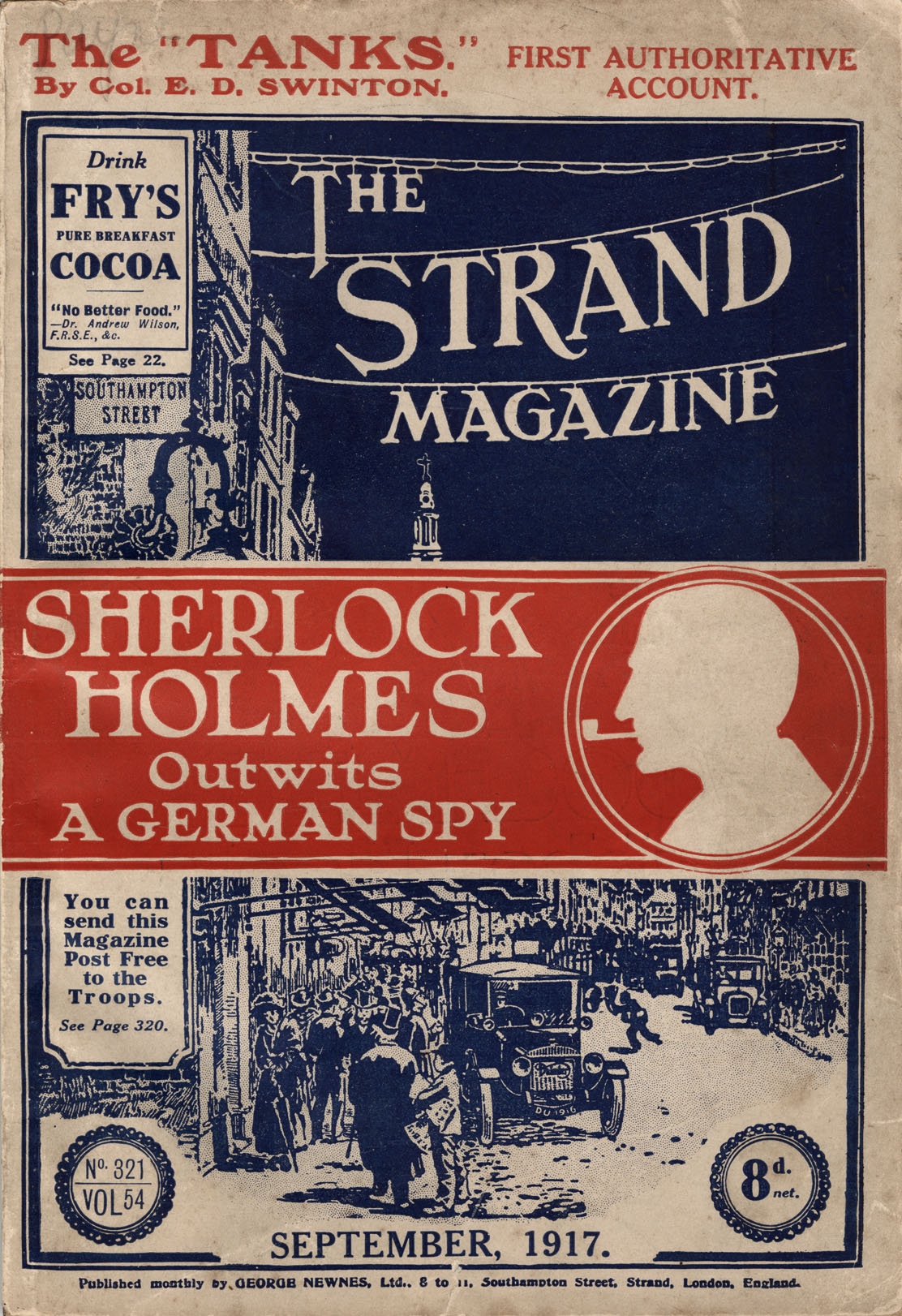
Cover of the September 1917 edition of the magazine featuring Sherlock Holmes

The Sherlock Holmes short stories by Arthur Conan Doyle were first published in The Strand in the UK. Some of the stories were previously or simultaneously published in US magazines, while several were first published in the United States in the US edition of The Strand Magazine a month after being published in the UK edition. 38 of the Sherlock Holmes stories, including The Hound of the Baskervilles, were illustrated by Sidney Paget in The Strand. Paget's illustrations helped form the popular image of Holmes. With the serialisation of Doyle's The Hound of the Baskervilles, sales reached their peak. Readers lined up outside the magazine's offices, waiting to get the next installment. Doyle also wrote other stories that were published in The Strand Magazine.

A number of short stories by Agatha Christie were first published in The Strand in the UK, such as the Hercule Poirot stories collected in The Labours of Hercules. Many short stories by P. G. Wodehouse, including most of Wodehouse's Jeeves short stories, were first published in The Strand in the UK (some were published earlier or in the same month in US magazines).

Other contributors included E. W. Hornung, Graham Greene, Rudyard Kipling, W. Somerset Maugham, E. Nesbit, Dorothy L. Sayers, Georges Simenon, Leo Tolstoy, and H. G. Wells, as well as Grant Allen, Margery Allingham, H. C. McNeile (aka Sapper), J. E. Preston Muddock, E. C. Bentley, Mary Angela Dickens, C. B. Fry, Walter Goodman, W. W. Jacobs, Arthur Morrison, Edgar Wallace, Max Beerbohm and Dornford Yates.

== Puzzles and non-fiction ==
In addition to the many fiction pieces and illustrations, The Strand has been also known for some time as the source of ground-breaking brain teasers, under a column called "Perplexities", first written by Henry Dudeney. Dudeney introduced many new concepts to the puzzle world, including the first known crossnumber puzzle, in 1926. In that same year, Dudeney produced an article, "The Psychology of Puzzle Crazes", reflecting and analysing the demand for such works. He edited Perplexities from 1910 until he died in 1930. G. H. Savage became the column's editor, soon to be joined by William Thomas Williams (as W. T. Williams), who in 1935 authored the best-known cross-figure puzzle of today. The puzzle goes by many names, the original being "The Little Pigley Farm". It has also been known as "Dog's Mead", "Little Pigley", "Little Piggly Farm", "Little Pigsby", "Pilgrims' Plot", and "Dog Days".

Some articles by Winston Churchill were published in the magazine. Once a sketch drawn by Queen Victoria of one of her children appeared with her permission. Early issues of the magazine featured non-fiction articles about features and institutions of London, such as the Fire Brigade, the River Police or the veterinary college.

== Cover ==
The magazine's iconic cover, an illustration looking eastwards down London's Strand towards St Mary-le-Strand, with the title suspended on telegraph wires, was the work of Victorian artist and designer George Charles Haité. The initial cover featured a corner plaque showing the name of Burleigh Street, home to the magazine's original offices. The lettering on the plaque in Haité's design was later changed when Newnes moved to the adjacent address of Southampton Street. A variation of the same design was featured on the cover of a sister title, The Strand Musical Magazine.

== 1998 revival ==
The Strand was brought back into publication in 1998 as a quarterly magazine, now based in Birmingham, Michigan, US. It has published fiction by many well-known writers including John Mortimer, Ray Bradbury, Alexander McCall Smith, Ruth Rendell, Colin Dexter, Edward Hoch, James Grippando, and Tennessee Williams. The magazine features stories from emerging crime and mystery writers in addition to stories by established writers.
