= W. T. Williams =

Australian botanist (1913–1995)

William Thomas Williams FAA OBE (18 April 1913 – 15 October 1995) was an English and Australian botanist and plant taxonomist, known for his work on algorithms for numerical taxonomy.

== Biography ==
Williams was born 18 April 1913 in Fulham, London, England, the only child of a Welsh coal miner. He went to the Stationers' Company's School in London and then to the Imperial College of Science and Technology, also in London, from which he earned a bachelor's degree 1933, a PhD and diploma in 1940, and a D.Sc. in 1956. While studying for his PhD, Williams taught at Imperial College from 1933 to 1936, and at Sir John Cass Technical College from 1936 to 1940.

During World War II, he served in the Royal Artillery, Royal Army Ordnance Corps, and Royal Electrical and Mechanical Engineers. He enlisted as a private (neglecting to inform the military about his degrees) but eventually reached the rank of major.

After the war, he became a lecturer at Bedford College for Women, where he stayed from 1946 to 1951. He then moved to the University of Southampton, where he was professor of botany and head of the department of botany from 1951 to 1965.

In 1965, Williams' former Southampton colleague Godfrey Lance invited him to visit the Commonwealth Scientific and Industrial Research Organisation (CSIRO) in Canberra, Australia. A year later, Williams moved to CSIRO himself, at the same time becoming an Australian citizen. He worked in CSIRO's Division of Computing Research in Canberra from 1966 to 1968, and then transferred to the Division of Tropical Pastures in Brisbane, where he worked from 1968 to 1973.

Williams retired from CSIRO in 1973, at which point he moved from Brisbane to Townsville. During his retirement he continued to work as a consultant for several institutions.

== Research ==
Williams' early work was on plant physiology, and more specifically on leaf expansion and the function of the Stomata. However, while at Southampton he became interested in more mathematical and statistical research topics such as the spatial distribution of plants. At the same time, he began writing software for his statistical analysis, using the Ferranti Pegasus computer then available at Southampton's computer centre. The centre's director, Godfrey Lance, was later to become a regular research collaborator of Williams.

Williams' most heavily cited research work, with Lance, makes the observation that five different hierarchical clustering strategies then in use could all be related to each other: all five use formulas for the distance between clusters that vary only in the weights of certain numerical coefficients. This unification allowed the coefficients to be chosen based on their effect on the overall clustering rather than, as had been done before, selecting the clustering strategy on an ad hoc basis.

Williams and Lance also introduced the Canberra distance, a form of Manhattan distance between pairs of points normalised by dividing by the total Manhattan distance of the points from the origin. The normalisation makes this distance measure particularly suited for data sets in which some data values may significantly differ from the rest.

Recognizing the general applicability of these methods, Williams went on at CSIRO to apply them to problems other than plant taxonomy, as well as to the classification of angiosperms and grasses. In this work, he viewed numerical taxonomy as a form of exploratory data analysis, intended more to generate new hypotheses than to confirm them.

== Other activities ==
Williams was an avid composer of mathematical puzzles; for instance, he wrote the cross-figure puzzle "The Little Pigley Farm" (also known as Dog's Mead, Little Pigley, Little Piggly Farm, Little Pigsby, Pilgrims' Plot, or Dog Days) which he first published in 1935 in The Strand Magazine.

Long a self-taught piano player, Williams took lessons after moving to Australia, earned a credential, and taught piano himself. He also organised the first North Queensland Piano Competition.

== Awards and honours ==
In 1973, the University of Queensland awarded Williams an honorary doctorate. He was elected as a fellow of the Australian Academy of Science in 1978, and in 1980 he became an officer of the Order of the British Empire.
