= Andres and Marzo's delta =

In statistics, Andrés and Marzo's Delta is a measure of an agreement between two observers used in classifying data. It was created by Andres & Marzo in 2004.

== Rationale for use ==
The most commonly used measure of agreement between observers is Cohen's kappa. The value of kappa is not always easy to interpret and it may perform poorly if the values are asymmetrically distributed. It also requires that the data be independent. The delta statistic may be of use when faced with the potential difficulties.

== Mathematical formulation ==
Delta was created with the model of a set of students (C) having to choose correct responses (R) from a set of n questions each with K alternative answers. Then

$$\frac{K\Sigma_{ii} - n }{n(K-1)}$$

where the sum is taken over all the answers ( x_{ij} ) and x_{ii} are the values along the main diagonal of the C x R matrix of answers.

This formula was extended to more complex cases and estimates of the variance of delta were made by Andres and Marzo.

== Uses ==
It has been used in a variety of applications including ecological mapping and alien species identification.
