= Canberra distance =

Measure of distance between vectors

The Canberra distance is a numerical measure of the distance between pairs of points in a vector space, introduced in 1966 and refined in 1967 by Godfrey N. Lance and William T. Williams. It is a weighted version of L₁ (Manhattan) distance. The Canberra distance has been used as a metric for comparing ranked lists and for intrusion detection in computer security. It has also been used to analyze the gut microbiome in different disease states.

== Definition ==
The Canberra distance d between vectors p and q in an n-dimensional real vector space is given as follows:

$$d(\mathbf{p}, \mathbf{q}) = \sum_{i=1}^n \frac{|p_i-q_i|}{|p_i|+|q_i|}$$

where

$$\mathbf{p}=(p_1,p_2,\dots,p_n)\text{ and }\mathbf{q}=(q_1,q_2,\dots,q_n)$$

are vectors.

The Canberra metric, Adkins form, divides the distance d by (n-Z) where Z is the number of attributes that are 0 for p and q.

== See also ==
- Normed vector space
- Metric
- Manhattan distance
