= Tschuprow's T =

$T = \sqrt{ \frac{\phi^2}{\sqrt{(r-1)(c-1)}} }$

Tschuprow's T

In statistics, Tschuprow's T is a measure of association between two nominal variables, giving a value between 0 and 1 (inclusive). It is closely related to Cramér's V, coinciding with it for square contingency tables. It was published by Alexander Tschuprow (alternative spelling: Chuprov) in 1939.

== Definition ==
For an r × c contingency table with r rows and c columns, let $\pi_{ij}$ be the proportion of the population in cell $(i,j)$ and let

$\pi_{i+}=\sum_{j=1}^c\pi_{ij}$ and $\pi_{+j}=\sum_{i=1}^r\pi_{ij}.$

Then the mean square contingency is given as

$$\phi^2 = \sum_{i=1}^r\sum_{j=1}^c\frac{(\pi_{ij}-\pi_{i+}\pi_{+j})^2}{\pi_{i+}\pi_{+j}} ,$$

and Tschuprow's T as

$$T = \sqrt{\frac{\phi^2}{\sqrt{(r-1)(c-1)}}} .$$

=== Properties ===
T equals zero if and only if independence holds in the table, i.e., if and only if $\pi_{ij}=\pi_{i+}\pi_{+j}$. T equals one if and only there is perfect dependence in the table, i.e., if and only if for each i there is only one j such that $\pi_{ij}>0$ and vice versa. Hence, it can only equal 1 for square tables. In this it differs from Cramér's V, which can be equal to 1 for any rectangular table.

=== Estimation ===
If we have a multinomial sample of size n, the usual way to estimate T from the data is via the formula

$$\hat T = \sqrt{ \frac{\sum_{i=1}^r\sum_{j=1}^c\frac{(p_{ij}-p_{i+}p_{+j})^2}{p_{i+}p_{+j}}}{\sqrt{(r-1)(c-1)}} } ,$$

where $p_{ij}=n_{ij}/n$ is the proportion of the sample in cell $(i,j)$. This is the empirical value of T. With $\chi^2$ the Pearson chi-square statistic, this formula can also be written as

$$\hat T = \sqrt{ \frac{\chi^2/n}{\sqrt{(r-1)(c-1)}} } .$$

== See also ==
Other measures of correlation for nominal data:

- Cramér's V
- Phi coefficient
- Uncertainty coefficient
- Lambda coefficient

Other related articles:

- Effect size
