= Tversky index =

Asymmetric similarity measure on sets

The Tversky index, named after Amos Tversky, is an asymmetric similarity measure on sets that compares a variant to a prototype. The Tversky index can be seen as a generalization of the Sørensen–Dice coefficient and the Jaccard index.

For sets X and Y the Tversky index is a number between 0 and 1 given by

$S(X, Y) = \frac{| X \cap Y |}{| X \cap Y | + \alpha | X \setminus Y | + \beta | Y \setminus X |}$

Here, $X \setminus Y$ denotes the relative complement of Y in X.

Further, $\alpha, \beta \ge 0$ are parameters of the Tversky index. Setting $\alpha = \beta = 1$ produces the Jaccard index; setting $\alpha = \beta = 0.5$ produces the Sørensen–Dice coefficient.

If we consider X to be the prototype and Y to be the variant, then $\alpha$ corresponds to the weight of the prototype and $\beta$ corresponds to the weight of the variant. Tversky measures with $\alpha + \beta = 1$ are of special interest.

Because of the inherent asymmetry, the Tversky index does not meet the criteria for a similarity metric. However, if symmetry is needed a variant of the original formulation has been proposed using max and min functions .

$S(X,Y)=\frac{| X \cap Y |}{| X \cap Y |+\beta\left(\alpha a+(1-\alpha)b\right)}$

$a=\min\left(|X \setminus Y|,|Y \setminus X|\right)$,

$b=\max\left(|X \setminus Y|,|Y \setminus X|\right)$,

This formulation also re-arranges parameters $\alpha$ and $\beta$. Thus, $\alpha$ controls the balance between $|X \setminus Y|$ and $|Y \setminus X|$ in the denominator. Similarly, $\beta$ controls the effect of the symmetric difference $|X\,\triangle\,Y\,|$ versus $| X \cap Y |$ in the denominator.
