= Bennett, Alpert and Goldstein's S =

Statistical measure of inter-rater agreement

Bennett, Alpert & Goldstein’s S is a statistical measure of inter-rater agreement. It was created by Bennett et al. in 1954.

== Rationale for use ==
Bennett et al. suggested adjusting inter-rater reliability to accommodate the percentage of rater agreement that might be expected by chance was a better measure than simple agreement between raters. They proposed an index which adjusted the proportion of rater agreement based on the number of categories employed.

== Mathematical formulation ==
The formula for S is

$$S = \frac{ Q P_a - 1 } { Q - 1 }$$

where Q is the number of categories and P_{a} is the proportion of agreement between raters.

The variance of S is

$$\operatorname{Var}(S) = \left( \frac { Q } { Q - 1 } \right)^2 \frac { P_a ( P_a - 1 ) } { n - 1 }$$

== Notes ==
This statistic is also known as Guilford’s G. Guilford was the first person to use the approach extensively in the determination of inter-rater reliability.
