= Overlap coefficient =

Similarity measure between sets

The overlap coefficient, (Note: The use of the term "overlap" appears in the comment for formula #27 in Table 2 of McGill et al. (1979), which references Sager & Lockemann (1976).) or Szymkiewicz–Simpson coefficient, is a similarity measure that measures the overlap between two finite sets. It is related to the Jaccard index and is defined as the size of the intersection divided by the size of the smaller of two sets:

$$\operatorname{overlap}(A,B) = \frac{| A \cap B | }{\min(|A|,|B|)}$$

Note that $0 \leq \operatorname{overlap}(A,B) \leq 1$. If set A is a subset of B or the converse, then the overlap coefficient is equal to 1.

== See also ==
- Jaccard index
