= Klecka's tau =

Klecka's tau (τ) is a statistic which is used to test whether a given classification analysis improves one's classification to groups over a random allocation to the various groups under consideration. The maximum value of τ is 1.0 indicating no errors in the prediction. A value of zero indicates no improvement over a random assignment.

The distribution of τ is not presently known and it is used as a descriptive rather than as an analytic statistic.

== Rationale for use ==
Klecka's τ was developed for use with discriminant analysis. The raw accuracy of discriminant analysis the sum of correct predictions divided by the total number of cases. Klecka noted that although the percentage of cases predicted accurately is the most intuitive measure of discrimination, the magnitude of this percentage should be judged in relation to the expected percentage of correct classifications made by random assignment. A proportional reduction in error statistic (τ) can be calculated giving a standard measure of improvement over a random assignment regardless of the number of groups.

== Mathematical formulation ==
τ is defined as

$$\tau = \frac { n_{ corr } - \sum_{ i = 1 }^T p_i n_i } { N - \sum_{ i = 1 }^T p_i n_i }$$

where n_{corr} is the number of cases correctly classified, n_{i} is the number of cases in the i^{th} group, N is the total number of cases, T is the number of groups and p_{i} is the probability of a case being allocated to that group by chance (p_{i} = 1 / T ).

== Uses ==
In addition to its use in discriminant analysis it has been used in multiple regression analysis, probit regression, logistic regression and image analysis.
