= Renkonen similarity index =

The Renkonen similarity index (P), is a measure of dissimilarity between two communities (sites), based on relative (proportional) abundances $p_i = n_i/\sum{n_i}$ of individuals of composite species. It was developed by the botanist Olavi Renkonen and published in 1938.

$P = \sum{min(p_1;p_2)}$,

$p_1$ - percentage structure of one set,

$p_2$ - percentage structure of second set.

The codomain of this distance function ranges from 1 (identical proportional abundances) to 0 (no taxa shared).

== See also ==
- Index of dissimilarity
