= Cross-figure =

Number puzzle

Example grid for a cross-figure puzzle with some answers filled in

A cross-figure (also variously called cross number puzzle or figure logic) is a puzzle similar to a crossword in structure, but with entries that consist of numbers rather than words, where individual digits are entered in the blank cells. Clues may be mathematical ("the seventh prime number"), use general knowledge ("date of the Battle of Hastings") or refer to other clues ("9 down minus 3 across").

== Clues ==
The numbers can be clued in various ways:

- The clue can make it possible to find the number required directly, by using general knowledge (e.g. "Date of the Battle of Hastings") or arithmetic (e.g. "27 times 79") or other mathematical facts (e.g. "Seventh prime number")
- The clue may require arithmetic to be applied to another answer or answers (e.g. "25 across times 3" or "9 down minus 3 across")
- The clue may indicate possible answers but make it impossible to give the correct one without using crosslights (e.g. "A prime number")
- One answer may be related to another in a non-determinate way (e.g. "A multiple of 24 down" or "5 across with its digits rearranged")
- Some entries may either not be clued at all, or refer to another clue (e.g. 7 down may be clued as "See 13 down" if 13 down reads "7 down plus 5")
- Entries may be grouped together for clueing purposes, e.g. "1 across, 12 across, and 17 across together contain all the digits except 0"
- Some cross-figures use an algebraic type of clue, with various letters taking unknown values (e.g. "A - 2B", where neither A nor B is known in advance)
- Another special type of puzzle uses a real-world situation such as a family outing and base most clues on this (e.g. "Time taken to travel from Ayville to Beetown")

Cross-figures that use mostly the first type of clue may be used for educational purposes, but most enthusiasts would agree that this clue type should be used rarely, if at all. Without this type a cross-figure may superficially seem to be impossible to solve, since no answer can apparently be filled in until another has first been found, which without the first type of clue appears impossible. However, if a different approach is adopted where, instead of trying to find complete answers (as would be done for a crossword) one gradually narrows down the possibilities for individual cells (or, in some cases, whole answers) then the problem becomes tractable. For example, if 12 across and 7 down both have three digits and the clue for 12 across is "7 down times 2", one can work out that (i) the last digit of 12 across must be even, (ii) the first digit of 7 down must be 1, 2, 3 or 4, and (iii) the first digit of 12 across must be between 2 and 9 inclusive. (It is an implicit rule of cross-figures that numbers cannot start with 0; however, some puzzles explicitly allow this) By continuing to apply this sort of argument, a solution can eventually be found. Another implicit rule of cross-figures is that no two answers should be the same (in cross-figures allowing numbers to start with 0, 0123 and 123 may be considered different.)

== Creation ==
A curious feature of cross-figures is that it makes perfect sense for the setter of a puzzle to try to solve it themself. Indeed, the setter should ideally do this (without direct reference to the answer) as it is essentially the only way to find out if the puzzle has a single unique solution. Alternatively, there are computer programs available that can be used for this purpose; however, they may not make it clear how difficult the puzzle is.

== Popularity ==
Given that some basic mathematical knowledge is needed to solve cross-figures, they are much less popular than crosswords. As a result, very few books of them have ever been published. Dell Magazines publishes a magazine called Math & Logic Problems four times a year that includes these puzzles, which they name "Figure Logics"; the eighteen puzzles contained within each issue generally increase in difficulty, from easy to "challenger". A magazine called Figure it Out, which was dedicated to number puzzles, included some, but it was very short-lived. This also explains why cross-figures have fewer established conventions than crosswords (especially cryptic crosswords). One exception is the use of the semicolon (;) to attach two strings of numbers together, for example 1234;5678 becomes 12345678. Some cross-figures voluntarily ignore this option and other "non-mathematical" approaches (e.g. palindromic numbers and repunits) where the same result can be achieved through algebraic means.
