= Conceptualization (information science) =

Simplified view of selected parts of the world

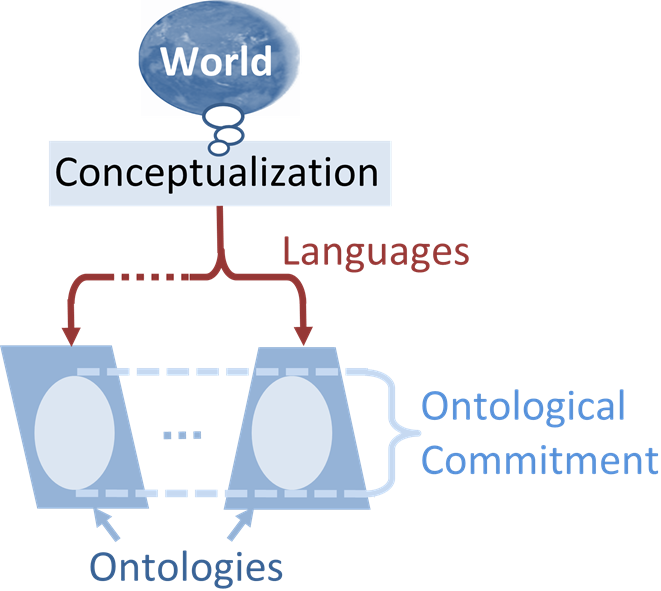
Chart showing the relation between a conceptualization in information science, its various ontologies (each with its own specialized language), and their shared ontological commitment.

In information science, a conceptualization is an abstract simplified view of some selected parts of the world, containing the objects, concepts, and other entities that are presumed of interest for some particular purpose and the relationships between them. An explicit specification of a conceptualization is an ontology, and it may occur that a conceptualization can be realized by several distinct ontologies. An ontological commitment in describing ontological comparisons is taken to refer to that subset of elements of an ontology shared with all the others. "An ontology is language-dependent", its objects and interrelations described within the language it uses, while a conceptualization is always the same, more general, its concepts existing "independently of the language used to describe it". The relation between these terms is shown in the figure to the right.

Not all workers in knowledge engineering use the term "conceptualization", but instead refer to the conceptualization itself, or to the ontological commitment of all its realizations, as an overarching ontology.

== Purpose and implementation ==
As a higher level abstraction, a conceptualization facilitates the discussion and comparison of its various ontologies, facilitating knowledge sharing and reuse. Each ontology based upon the same overarching conceptualization maps the conceptualization into specific elements and their relationships.

The question then arises as to how to describe the "conceptualization" in terms that can encompass multiple ontologies. This issue has been called the Tower of Babel problem, that is, how can persons used to one ontology talk with others using a different ontology? This problem is easily grasped, but a general resolution is not at hand. It can be a "bottom-up" or a "top-down" approach, or something in between.

However, in more artificial situations, such as information systems, the idea of a "conceptualization" and the "ontological commitment" of various ontologies that realize the "conceptualization" is possible. The formation of a conceptualization and its ontologies involves these steps:

- specification of the conceptualization
- ontology concepts: every definition involves the definitions of other terms
- relationships between the concepts: this step maps conceptual relationships onto the ontology structure
- groups of concepts: this step may lead to the creation of sub-ontologies
- formal description of ontology commitments, for example, to make them computer readable

An example of moving conception into a language leading to a variety of ontologies is the expression of a process in pseudocode (a strictly structured form of ordinary language) leading to implementation in several different formal computer languages like Lisp or Fortran. The pseudocode makes it easier to understand the instructions and compare implementations, but the formal languages make possible the compilation of the ideas as computer instructions.

Another example is mathematics, where a very general formulation (the analog of a conceptualization) is illustrated with "applications" that are more specialized examples. For instance, aspects of a function space can be illustrated using a vector space or a topological space that introduce interpretations of the "elements" of the conceptualization and additional relationships between them but preserve the connections required in the function space.

== See also ==
- Knowledge representation and reasoning
- Ontology alignment
- Ontology (information science)
- Semantic integration
- Semantic matching
- Semantic translation
