= Lightweight ontology =

Loose schemas for organising knowledge

A lightweight ontology is an ontology or knowledge organization system in which concepts are connected by rather general associations than strict formal connections. Examples of lightweight ontologies include associative network and multilingual classifications but the term is not used consistently.

Following the approach described in and exploiting dedicated Natural language processing (NLP) techniques tuned to short phrases (for instance, as described in), each node label can be translated into an unambiguous formal expression, i.e. into a propositional Description Logic (DL) expression. As a result, lightweight ontologies, or formal classifications, are tree-like structures where each node label is a language-independent propositional DL formula codifying the meaning of the node. Taking into account its context (namely the path from the root node), each node formula is subsumed by the formula of the node above. As a consequence, the backbone structure of a lightweight ontology is represented by subsumption relations between nodes. For example, in case a node labeled “car” is under a node labeled “red” we can say that the meaning of the node “car” is “red car” in this case. This is translated into the logical formula “red AND car”. provides some examples of lightweight ontologies. and show how lightweight ontologies can be used to automate important tasks, in particular to favor interoperability among different knowledge organization systems. is an example of how a lightweight ontology can be used selectively for information exchange and service interoperability in time-critical decision support systems.

== See also ==
- Ontology alignment
- Semantic matching
- Semantic integration
- Minimal mappings
