= Ontology-based data integration =

Data integration approach

Ontology-based data integration involves the use of one or more ontologies to effectively combine data or information from multiple heterogeneous sources. It is one of the multiple data integration approaches and may be classified as Global-As-View (GAV). The effectiveness of ontology‑based data integration is closely tied to the consistency and expressivity of the ontology used in the integration process.

== Background ==
Data from multiple sources are characterized by multiple types of heterogeneity. The following hierarchy is often used:

- Syntactic heterogeneity: is a result of differences in representation format of data
- Schematic or structural heterogeneity: the native model or structure to store data differ in data sources leading to structural heterogeneity. Schematic heterogeneity that particularly appears in structured databases is also an aspect of structural heterogeneity.
- Semantic heterogeneity: differences in interpretation of the 'meaning' of data are source of semantic heterogeneity
- System heterogeneity: use of different operating system, hardware platforms lead to system heterogeneity

Ontologies, as formal models of representation with explicitly defined concepts and named relationships linking them, are used to address the issue of semantic heterogeneity in data sources. In domains like bioinformatics and biomedicine, the rapid development, adoption and public availability of ontologies has made it possible for the data integration community to leverage them for semantic integration of data and information.

== The role of ontologies ==
Ontologies enable the unambiguous identification of entities in heterogeneous information systems and assertion of applicable named relationships that connect these entities together. Specifically, ontologies play the following roles:

Content Explication
The ontology enables accurate interpretation of data from multiple sources through the explicit definition of terms and relationships in the ontology.

Query Model
In some systems like SIMS, the query is formulated using the ontology as a global query schema.

Verification
The ontology verifies the mappings used to integrate data from multiple sources. These mappings may either be user specified or generated by a system.

== Approaches using ontologies for data integration ==
There are three main architectures that are implemented in ontology‑based data integration applications, namely,

Single ontology approach
A single ontology is used as a global reference model in the system. This is the simplest approach as it can be simulated by other approaches. SIMS is a prominent example of this approach. The Structured Knowledge Source Integration component of Research Cyc is another prominent example of this approach. (Title = Harnessing Cyc to Answer Clinical Researchers' Ad Hoc Queries). The Gellish Taxonomic Dictionary-Ontology follows this approach as well.

Multiple ontologies
Multiple ontologies, each modeling an individual data source, are used in combination for integration. Though, this approach is more flexible than the single ontology approach, it requires creation of mappings between the multiple ontologies. Ontology mapping is a challenging issue and is focus of large number of research efforts in computer science . The OBSERVER system is an example of this approach.

Hybrid approaches
The hybrid approach involves the use of multiple ontologies that subscribe to a common, top-level vocabulary. The top-level vocabulary defines the basic terms of the domain. Thus, the hybrid approach makes it easier to use multiple ontologies for integration in presence of the common vocabulary.

== See also ==
- Data mapping
- Enterprise application integration
- Enterprise information integration
- Ontology mapping
- Schema matching
