= Knowledge integration =

Knowledge integration is the process of synthesizing multiple knowledge models (or representations) into a common model (representation).

Compared to information integration, which involves merging information having different schemas and representation models, knowledge integration focuses more on synthesizing the understanding of a given subject from different perspectives.

For example, multiple interpretations are possible of a set of student grades, typically each from a certain perspective. An overall, integrated view and understanding of this information can be achieved if these interpretations can be put under a common model, say, a student performance index.

The Web-based Inquiry Science Environment (WISE), from the University of California at Berkeley has been developed along the lines of knowledge integration theory.

Knowledge integration has also been studied as the process of incorporating new information into a body of existing knowledge with an interdisciplinary approach. This process involves determining how the new information and the existing knowledge interact, how existing knowledge should be modified to accommodate the new information, and how the new information should be modified in light of the existing knowledge.

A learning agent that actively investigates the consequences of new information can detect and exploit a variety of learning opportunities; e.g., to resolve knowledge conflicts and to fill knowledge gaps. By exploiting these learning opportunities the learning agent is able to learn beyond the explicit content of the new information.

The machine learning program KI, developed by Murray and Porter at the University of Texas at Austin, was created to study the use of automated and semi-automated knowledge integration to assist knowledge engineers constructing a large knowledge base.

A possible technique which can be used is semantic matching. More recently, a technique useful to minimize the effort in mapping validation and visualization has been presented which is based on Minimal Mappings. Minimal mappings are high quality mappings such that i) all the other mappings can be computed from them in time linear in the size of the input graphs, and ii) none of them can be dropped without losing property i).

The University of Waterloo operated a Bachelor of Knowledge Integration undergraduate degree program as an academic major or minor. The program started in 2008.

== See also ==
- Data integration
- Knowledge value chain
