= Ontology mapping =

Ontology mapping may refer to:

- Ontology alignment, the process of determining correspondences between concepts in ontologies
- Semantic integration, the process of interrelating information from diverse sources
- Semantic matching, the process of mapping to exchange information in a semantically sound manner
