= OpenVault =

- Industry: Broadband
- Founded: 2010
- Headquarters: Jersey City, New Jersey, U.S.
- Website: www.openvault.com

OpenVault is a provider of technology for management of broadband networks and information on broadband usage. It was incorporated in 2010 and is based in Jersey City, New Jersey. In 2020 it opened a wholly owned subsidiary, OpenVault Europe, in Berlin, Germany.

== Overview ==
OpenVault LLC provides network management, policy control, data integration, and business analytics software as a service that is designed to help communication service providers (CSPs) achieve revenue and operational goals. The company's aggregated data is used as research material for financial and industry analysts and media reporting on the broadband cable industry. OpenVault also publishes aggregated datasets quarterly in the OpenVault Broadband Insights (OVBI) report.

== COVID-19 ==
Throughout the COVID-19 pandemic of 2020, OpenVault data has illustrated the relationship between self-quarantine and increased usage of broadband. By the end of March, 2020, OpenVault data showed that business hours broadband consumption was up more than 50% from January of the same year; further analysis showed that overall usage reached a monthly peak of 402.8 GB/household in April 2020. OpenVault also has monitored the continued growth in upstream usage as employees and students work from home.

== Funding ==
OpenVault is a privately held company.

== Products ==
OpenVault products help broadband operators manage their networks, drive revenue, deploy usage-based billing, develop High-Speed Data (HSD) market strategies, predict HSD usage growth and forecast network planning.
