= DSSim =

DSSim is an ontology mapping system, that has been conceived to achieve a certain level of the envisioned machine intelligence on the Semantic Web. The main driving factors behind its development was to provide an alternative to the existing heuristics or machine learning based approaches with a multi-agent approach that makes use of uncertain reasoning. The system provides a possible approach to establish machine understanding over Semantic Web data through multi-agent beliefs and conflict resolution.

== Theoretical background ==
The DSSim framework for ontology mapping was introduced in 2005 by Miklos Nagy and Maria Vargas-Vera at the Open University (OU). DSSim addresses three challenges of the Semantic Web:

- Uncertainty: Ontology mapping agents adopt the Dempster–Shafer theory for creating beliefs over mapping hypothesis. Based on evidences of similarity the mapping agents combine their beliefs in order to provide a coherent view on the mappings. The system is based on a theoretical mental model for software agents to represent beliefs over similarities of different terms in different ontologies. Through these beliefs that are derived using different similarity measure and background knowledge, each agent can establish certain understanding of the terms and their context.
- Inconsistency: Conflicts in belief are resolved using fuzzy voting mechanism. Processing data on the Semantic Web produces scenarios where the different agents has conflicting beliefs over a particular solution. In these situations the agents need to resolve their conflicts in order to choose the best possible solution e.g. in our case mapping. Mapping agents use fuzzy voting to determine the best decision for agent society but in case voters make mistakes in their judgments, then the majority alternative (if it exists) is statistically most likely to be the best choice. The application of voting for mapping agents is a possible way to make systems more intelligent i.e. mimic the decision making how humans reach the decision on a problematic issue.
- Vastness: Genetic algorithms based optimisations techniques are used in order to provide a reasonable time frame for belief combination using large ontologies. One of the main disadvantages of using Dempster-Shafer theory for uncertain reasoning is the computational complexity of the belief combination. DSSim resolves the problem by using genetic algorithm for creating the graphical structure that is used to compute the belief combination efficiently in the ontology mapping context.

DSSim uses novel 3D visualisation techniques of both mapping and reasoning results. The main purpose of the reasoning storage and visualisation is to retain the reasoning states, in order to visualise it later to the end users. The main objective is to show to the end users why the system has selected a mapping candidate from two different ontologies.

== Evaluation of the system ==
The evaluation of the system was carried out in the Ontology Alignment Evaluation Initiative (OAEI). DSSim has participated in 2006, 2007, 2008 and 2009 achieving gradually improved results. The following sections present the result of two tracks out of 8 from the OAEI 2008.

Year	Available tracks	Participated tracks	Number of systems participated	DSSim track coverage
2006	5	1	10	20%
2007	7	6	17	85%
2008	8	8	13	100%
2009	8	7	16	87%

=== Library track at OAEI 2008 ===
According to the original task definition provided by the organizers of the OAEI 2008, the library track involved the alignment of two Dutch thesauri. These Dutch thesauri are used to index books from two collections held by the National Library of the Netherlands (KB). KB maintains two big collections: the Deposit Collection, containing all the Dutch printed publications (one million items), and the Scientific Collection, with about 1.4 million books mainly about the history, language and culture of the Netherlands. Each collection is described according to its own indexing system and conceptual vocabulary. On the one hand, the Scientific Collection was described using the GTT, a huge vocabulary containing 35,000 general concepts ranging from Wolkenkrabbers (Sky-scrapers) to Verzorging (Care). On the other hand, the books contained in the Deposit Collection are mainly indexed against the Brinkman thesaurus, containing a large set of headings (more than 5,000) that were expected to serve as global subjects of books. For each concept, the thesauri provided the usual lexical and semantic information: preferred labels, synonyms and notes, broader and related concepts, etc. The language of both thesauri was Dutch, but a quite substantial part of Brinkman concepts (around 60%) come with English labels. The library track was difficult partly because of its relative large size and because of its multilingual representation. Nevertheless in the library track DSSim has performed the best out of the 3 participating systems. However these ontologies contain related and broader terms therefore the mapping can be carried out without consulting multi-lingual background knowledge.

=== Directory track at OAEI 2008 ===
As stated by the original task definition provided by the organizers of the OAEI 2008, this track is designed to evaluate mapping quality in a real world taxonomy integration scenario. The main objective is to measure whether ontology alignment tools can effectively be applied to integration of "shallow ontologies". The evaluation dataset was extracted from Google, Yahoo! and Looksmart web directories. The way these ontology pairs were created was to rely on a reference interpretation for nodes, constructed by looking at their use. The assumption was that the semantics of nodes could have been derived from their pragmatics, namely from analysing, which documents were classified under which nodes. The basic idea was therefore to compute the relationship hypotheses based on the co-occurrence of documents. The specific characteristics of the dataset were:

- More than 4500 of node matching tasks, where each node matching task is composed from the paths to root of the nodes in the web directories.
- Expert mappings for all the matching tasks.
- Simple relationships. Basically web directories contain only one type of relationship the so called "classification relation".
- Vague terminology and modeling principles: The matching tasks incorporate the typical "real world" modeling and terminological errors.

System	Prec.	Rec.	F-measure.
DSSim	0.60	0.41	0.49
CIDER	0.60	0.38	0.47
Lily	0.59	0.37	0.46
TaxoMap	0.59	0.39	0.43
MapPSO	0.57	0.31	0.40
RiMOM	0.55	0.17	0.26
ASMOV	0.64	0.12	0.20

In the directory track only 6 systems have participated in 2008. In terms of F-value DSSim has performed the best however the difference was marginal compared to the CIDER or Lily systems.
