= Xiaohua Jia =

Chinese academic

Xiaohua Jia received his BSc (1984) and MEng (1987) from University of Science and Technology of China, and DSc (1991) in Information Science from University of Tokyo. He is currently Chair Professor with Dept of Computer Science at City University of Hong Kong. His research interests include cloud computing and distributed systems, data security and privacy, computer networks and mobile computing. Prof. Jia is an editor of IEEE Internet of Things, IEEE Trans. on Parallel and Distributed Systems (2006-2009), Wireless Networks, Journal of World Wide Web, Journal of Combinatorial Optimization, etc. He is the General Chair of ACM MobiHoc 2008, TPC Co-Chair of IEEE GlobeCom 2010 – Ad Hoc and Sensor Networking Symposium, Area-Chair of IEEE INFOCOM 2015-2017, Track-Chair of IEEE ICDCS 2019, and General Chair of ACM ICN 2019. He is Fellow of IEEE and an ACM Fellow.
