= Semantic technology =

Technology to help machines understand data

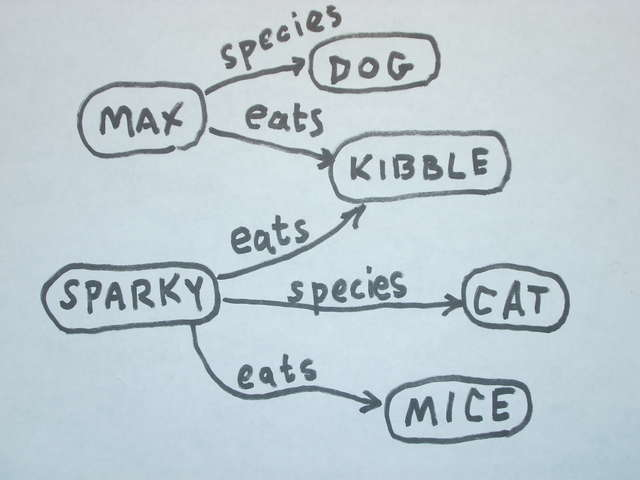
Simplistic example of the sort of semantic net used in Semantic Web technology

The ultimate goal of semantic technology is to help machines understand data. Well-known technologies that enable the encoding of semantics in data include the Resource Description Framework (RDF) and the Web Ontology Language (OWL). These technologies formally represent the meaning involved in information. For example, ontology can describe concepts, relationships between things, and categories of things. Embedding semantics in data offers significant advantages, such as enabling reasoning over data and dealing with heterogeneous data sources.

== Overview ==
In software, semantic technology encodes meanings separately from data and content files, and separately from application code. This enables machines as well as people to understand, share and reason with them at execution time. With semantic technologies, adding, changing and implementing new relationships or interconnecting programs in a different way can be just as simple as changing the external model that these programs share.

With traditional information technology, on the other hand, meanings and relationships must be predefined and "hard wired" into data formats and the application program code at design time. This means that when something changes, previously unexchanged information needs to be exchanged, or two programs need to interoperate in a new way, the humans must get involved.

Off-line, the parties must define and communicate between them the knowledge needed to make the change, and then recode the data structures and program logic to accommodate it, and then apply these changes to the database and the application. Then, and only then, can they implement the changes.

Semantic technologies are "meaning-centered". They involve but are not limited to the following areas of application:

- encoding/decoding of semantic representation,
- knowledge graphs of entities and their interrelationships,
- auto-recognition of topics and concepts,
- information and meaning extraction,
- semantic data integration, and
- taxonomies/classification.

Given a question, semantic technologies can directly search topics, concepts, associations that span a vast number of sources.

Semantic technologies provide an abstraction layer above existing IT technologies that enables bridging and interconnection of data, content, and processes. Second, from the portal perspective, semantic technologies can be thought of as a new level of depth that provides far more intelligent, capable, relevant, and responsive interaction than with information technologies alone. Semantic technologies would often leverage natural language processing and machine learning in order to extract topics, concepts, and associations between concepts in text.

== See also ==
- Knowledge graph
- Metadata
- Ontology – also known as a knowledge graph in a generalized term
- Resource Description Framework
- Schema.org – a set of schemas for structured data markup on web pages
- Semantic heterogeneity
- Semantic integration
- Semantic matching
- Semantic networks
- Semantic interoperability
- Semantic Web
- Web Ontology Language
