= Brij B. Gupta =

Indian professor

Brij Bhooshan Gupta
- Awards: Clarivate Research Excellence in Engineering and Technology (2023); Canadian Commonwealth Scholarship, Government of Canada; Faculty Research Fellowship Award (2017) from the MeitY, GoI; IEEE GCCE outstanding and WIE paper awards; Best Faculty Award (2018 & 2019) from NIT Kurukshetra; Clarivate Highly Cited Researcher (2022,2023); Stanford University's ranking of the top 2% scientists worldwide (2019-2025)

Academic background
- Education: Ph.D. from IIT Roorkee

Academic work
- Institutions: Asia University (Taiwan)

Brij Bhooshan Gupta is a professor with the Department of Computer Science and Information Engineering (CSIE), Asia University, Taiwan. He has published over 600 papers in journals/conferences including 35 books and 10 Patents with over 40,000 citations. He has also received numerous national and international awards including Clarivate Highly Cited Researcher in the world in Computer Science consecutively in year 2022 and 2023.

== Education ==
Gupta is an Indian scholar who earned his Ph.D. degree from the Indian Institute of Technology, Roorkee.

== Career ==
Professor Gupta's research interests encompass a range of topics, including cyber security, cloud computing, artificial intelligence, intrusion detection, blockchain technologies, cyber physical systems, social media, and networking.

Over the course of Gupta's two decades of professional career, he has published over 600 papers in various journals and conferences, including 35 books and has been granted 10 patents. His work has been widely cited over 40,000 times. Gupta also served as Distinguished Research Scientist at LoginRadius Inc., a company specializing in cybersecurity, particularly in the area of customer identity and access management (CIAM). Additionally, he was included in Stanford University's ranking of the top 2% scientists worldwide consecutively in last 6 years, since this list was released first time by the researchers from Stanford University in collaboration with Elsevier In 2017, Gupta became a senior member at IEEE. He was also chosen as the Distinguished Lecturer in IEEE CTSoc for the year 2021. Dr. Gupta also hold the position of Member-in-Large on the Board of Governors for the IEEE Consumer Technology Society (2022 to 2024).

Currently, Professor Gupta is working as the Director at the International Center for AI and Cyber Security Research and Innovations. He also serves as a Distinguished Professor in the Department of Computer Science and Information Engineering (CSIE) at Asia University, Taiwan.

== Awards and recognitions ==
- Clarivate Research Excellence in Engineering and Technology (2023)
- Canadian Commonwealth Scholarship (2009) Government of Canada
- Faculty Research Fellowship Award (2017) from the MeitY, Government of India
- IEEE GCCE outstanding and WIE paper awards
- Best Faculty Award (2018 & 2019) from NIT Kurukshetra
- Clarivate Highly Cited Researcher (2022,2023)

== Publications ==
1. A Survey of Deep Active Learning- ACM Computing Surveys
2. A Survey of Phishing Email Filtering Techniques- IEEE Communication Reviews & Tutorials
3. Deep learning based multi-channel intelligent attack detection for data security- IEEE transactions on Sustainable Computing
4. An Incentive Mechanism Considering Privacy Metric for Personalized Application-IEEE Transactions on Consumer Electronic s
5. IoT-based big data secure management in the fog over a 6G wireless network-IEEE Internet of Things Journal
6. Blockchain-assisted secure fine-grained searchable encryption for a cloud-based healthcare cyber-physical system-IEEE/CAA Journal of Automatica Sinica
7. A lightweight and robust secure key establishment protocol for internet of medical things in COVID-19 patients care-IEEE Internet of Things Journal
8. Boosting-based DDoS detection in internet of things systems-IEEE Internet of Things Journal
9. Blockchain-based secure data storage protocol for sensors in the industrial Internet of Things-IEEE Transactions on Industrial Informatics
10. Blockchain-assisted Puncturable Signcryption for Cloud and Fog-Hosted Industrial Cyber-Physical Systems-IEEE Network

== Books ==
=== Text books ===
1. Big Data Management and Analytics, World Scientific, Singapore, 2024 ISBN 978-981-12-5711-7
2. SDN and NFV: A New Dimension to Virtualization, World Scientific, Singapore, 2024. ISBN 978-981-12-5487-1
3. Secure Searchable Encryption and Data Management, CRC Press, Taylor & Francis Group, USA, 2021 ISBN 9780367619671
4. Distributed Denial of Service (DDoS) Attacks – Classification, Attacks, Challenges and Countermeasures,” CRC Press, Taylor & Francis Group, USA, 2021 ISBN 9780367619749
5. Online Social Networks Security: Principles, Algorithm, Applications, and Perspectives, CRC Press, Taylor & Francis Group, USA, 2021 ISBN 9780367619794
6. Beginners’ Guide to Internet of Thing Security: Attacks, Applications and Authentication Fundamentals and Security, CRC Press, Taylor & Francis Group, USA, 2020, ISBN 9781003001126
7. Cross-Site Scripting Attacks: Classification, Attack and Countermeasures, CRC Press, Taylor & Francis Group, USA, 2020 ISBN 9780429351327
8. Internet of Thing Security: Principles, Applications, Attacks and Countermeasures, CRC Press, Taylor & Francis Group, USA, 2020 ISBN 9780367373962
9. Smart Card Security: Applications, Attacks, and Countermeasures, CRC Press, Taylor & Francis Group, USA, 2019, ISBN 9780429345593

=== Edited/reference books ===
1. Post-Quantum Cryptography Algorithms and Approaches for IoT and Blockchain Security, Advances in Computers Series, Elsevier, 2025. ISBN 978-0-323-91478-9
2. Digital Forensics and Cyber Crime Investigation: Recent Advances and Future Directions, CRC Press Taylor & Francis Group, USA, 2024, ISBN 9781032075396
3. Innovations in Modern Cryptography, IGI Global, USA. 2024, ISBN 9798369353301
4. Metaverse Security Paradigms, IGI Global, USA. 2024, ISBN 979-8369338247
5. Intelligent Edge Computing for Cyber Physical Applications, Elsevier, 2023. ISBN 978-0323994125
6. Artificial Intelligence for Biometrics and Cybersecurity,” IET Book Series on Advances in Biometrics, IET press, 2023, ISBN 978-1-83953-547-5
7. Security and Privacy Preserving for IoT and 5G Networks: Techniques, Challenges, and New Directions (Vol. 95). Springer Nature, 2022 ISBN 978-3-030-85428-7
8. Handbook of Computer Networks and Cyber Security: Principles and Paradigms, Multimedia Systems and Applications Series, Springer, 2020, ISBN 978-3-030-22276-5
