= Vocabulary-based transformation =

Transformation aided by semantic equivalence statements within a controlled vocabulary

In metadata, a vocabulary-based transformation (VBT) is a transformation aided by the use of a semantic equivalence statements within a controlled vocabulary.

Many organizations today require communication between two or more computers. Although many standards exist to exchange data between computers such as HTML or email, there is still much structured information that needs to be exchanged between computers that is not standardized. The process of mapping one source of data into another is often a slow and labor-intensive process.

VBT is a possible way to avoid much of the time and cost of manual data mapping using traditional extract, transform, load technologies.

== History ==
The term vocabulary-based transformation was first defined by Roy Schulte of the Gartner Group around October 2002 and appeared in the annual "hype cycle" for integration.

== Application ==
VBT allows computer systems integrators to more automatically "look up" the definitions of data elements in a centralized data dictionary and use that definition and the equivalent mappings to transform that data element into a foreign namespace.

The Web Ontology Language (OWL) language also support three semantic equivalence statements.

== Companies or products ==
- IONA Technologies
- Contivo and Delta by Liaison Technologies
- enLeague Systems
- ItemField
- Unicorn Solutions
- Vitria Technology
- Zonar

== See also ==
- Controlled vocabulary
- Data dictionary
- Enterprise application integration
- Metadata
- Semantic equivalence
- Semantic spectrum
- XSLT
