= Data blending =

Process of merging big data

Data blending is a process whereby big data from multiple sources are merged into a single data warehouse or data set.

Data blending allows business analysts to cope with the expansion of data that they need to make critical business decisions based on good quality business intelligence. Data blending has been described as different from data integration due to the requirements of data analysts to merge sources very quickly, too quickly for any practical intervention by data scientists. A study done by Forrester Consulting in 2015 found that 52 percent of companies are blending 50 or more data sources and 12 percent are blending over 1,000 sources.

== Extract, transform, load ==
Data blending is similar to extract, transform, load (ETL). Both ETL and data blending take data from various sources and combine them. However, ETL is used to merge and structure data into a target database, often a data warehouse. Data blending differs slightly as it's about joining data for a specific use case at a specific time. With some software, data isn't written into a database, which is very different to ETL. For example, with Google Data Studio.

== Software products ==
Representing the increased demand for analysts to combine data sources, multiple software companies have seen large growth and raised millions of dollars, with some early entrants into the market now public companies. Examples include AWS, Alteryx, Microsoft Power Query, and Incorta, which enable combining data from many different data sources, for example, text files, databases, XML, JSON, and many other forms of structured and semi-structured data.

=== Tableau ===
In tableau software, data blending is a technique to combine data from multiple data sources in the data visualization. A key differentiator is the granularity of the data join. When blending data into a single data set, this would use a SQL database join, which would usually join at the most granular level, using an ID field where possible. A data blend in tableau should happen at the least granular level.

=== Looker Studio ===
In Google's Looker Studio, data sources are combined by joining the records of one data source with the records of up to 4 other data sources. Similar to Tableau, the data blend only happens on the reporting layer. The blended data is never stored as a separate combined data source.

== Challenges with data blending ==
The most common custom metadata question is: "How can this dataset blend with (join or union to) my other datasets?"

== See also ==
- Data preparation
- Data fusion
- Data wrangling
- Data cleansing
- Data editing
- Data scraping
- Data curation
- Data preprocessing
