= International Journal on Semantic Web and Information Systems =

- Discipline: Semantic web; information systems
- Language: English
- Edited by: Brij B. Gupta

Publication details
- History: 2005–present
- Publisher: IGI Global (United States)
- Frequency: Quarterly
- Impact factor: 4.1 (2023)

Standard abbreviations
- ISO 4: Int. J. Semant. Web Inf. Syst.

Indexing
- ISSN: 1552-6283 (print); 1552-6291 (web)

Links
- Journal homepage

The International Journal on Semantic Web and Information Systems (IJSWIS) is a quarterly peer-reviewed academic journal covering the semantic web and information systems. It was established in 2005 and is published by IGI Global. The editor-in-chief is Brij B. Gupta, Who is a professor at Asia University, Taiwan, and Director of the International Center for AI and Cyber Security Research and Innovations. Brij B. Gupta is also serving as Member-in-Large, Board of Governors, IEEE Consumer Technology Society (2022–2024) and also included in the list of 2022 Highly Cited Researchers in Computer Science by Clarivate.

== Abstracting and indexing ==
The journal is abstracted and indexed in:

- ACM Digital Library
- Compendex (Elsevier Engineering Index)
- DBLP
- INSPEC (IET)
- SCOPUS
- Web of Science (All Journals)
- Web of Science Science Citation Index Expanded (SCIE)

According to the Journal Citation Reports, the journalactor]] of 4.1
