= Enterprise information integration =

Type of information display

Enterprise information integration (EII) is the ability to support a unified view of data and information for an entire organization. The goal of EII is to get a large set of heterogeneous data sources to appear to a user or system as a single, homogeneous data source. In a data virtualization application of EII, there is a process of information integration, using data abstraction to provide a unified interface (known as uniform data access) for viewing all the data within an organization, and a single set of structures and naming conventions (known as uniform information representation) to represent this data.

== Overview ==
Data within an enterprise can be stored in heterogeneous formats, including relational databases (which themselves come in a large number of varieties), text files, XML files, spreadsheets and a variety of proprietary storage methods, each with their own indexing and data access methods.

Standardized data access APIs have emerged that offer a specific set of commands to retrieve and modify data from a generic data source. Many applications exist that implement these APIs' commands across various data sources, most notably relational databases. Such APIs include ODBC, JDBC, XQJ, OLE DB, and more recently ADO.NET.

There are also standard formats for representing data within a file that are very important to information integration. The best-known of these is XML, which has emerged as a standard universal representation format. There are also more specific XML "grammars" defined for specific types of data such as Geography Markup Language for expressing geographical features and Directory Service Markup Language for holding directory-style information. In addition, non-XML standard formats exist such as iCalendar for representing calendar information and vCard for business card information.

Enterprise Information Integration (EII) applies data integration commercially. Despite the theoretical problems described above, the private sector shows more concern with the problems of data integration as a viable product. EII emphasizes neither correctness nor tractability, but speed and simplicity.

=== Uniform data access ===
Uniform data access means connectivity and controllability across numerous target data sources. Necessary to fields such as EII and Electronic Data Interchange (EDI), it is most often used regarding analysis of disparate data types and data sources, which must be rendered into a uniform information representation, and generally must appear homogenous to the analysis tools—when the data being analyzed is typically heterogeneous and widely varying in size, type, and original representation.

=== Uniform information representation ===
Uniform information representation allows information from several realms or disciplines to be displayed and worked with as if it came from the same realm or discipline. It takes information from a number of sources, which may have used different methodologies and metrics in their data collection, and builds a single large collection of information, where some records may be more complete than others across all fields of data

Uniform information representation is particularly important in EII and Electronic Data Interchange (EDI), where different departments of a large organization may have collected information for different purposes, with different labels and units, until one department realized that data already collected by those other departments could be re-purposed for their own needs—saving the enterprise the effort and cost of re-collecting the same information.

=== Combining disparate data sets ===
Each data source is disparate and as such is not designed to support EII. Therefore, data virtualization as well as data federation depends upon accidental data commonality to support combining data and information from disparate data sets. Because of this lack of data value commonality across data sources, the return set may be inaccurate, incomplete, and impossible to validate.

One solution is to recast disparate databases to integrate these databases without the need for ETL. The recast databases support commonality constraints where referential integrity may be enforced between databases. The recast databases provide designed data access paths with data value commonality across databases.

=== Simplicity of deployment ===
Even if recognized as a solution to a problem, EII as of 2009 currently takes time to apply and offers complexities in deployment. Proposed schema-less solutions include "Lean Middleware".

=== Handling higher-order information ===
Analysts experience difficulty—even with a functioning information integration system—in determining whether the sources in the database will satisfy a given application. Answering these kinds of questions about a set of repositories requires semantic information like metadata and/or ontologies.

== Applications ==
EII products enable loose coupling between homogeneous-data consuming client applications and services and heterogeneous-data stores. Such client applications and services include Desktop Productivity Tools (spreadsheets, word processors, presentation software, etc.), development environments and frameworks (Java EE, .NET, Mono, SOAP or RESTful Web services, etc.), business intelligence (BI), business activity monitoring (BAM) software, enterprise resource planning (ERP), Customer relationship management (CRM), business process management (BPM and/or BPEL) Software, and web content management (CMS).

== Data access technologies ==
- Service Data Objects (SDO) for Java, C++ and .Net clients and any type of data source
- XQuery and XQuery API for Java

== See also ==
- Big data – Extremely large or complex datasets
- Business Intelligence 2.0 (BI 2.0)
- Data lake – Repository of data stored in a raw format
- Data warehouse – Centralized storage of knowledge
- Disparate system – Data processing system without interaction with other computer data processing systems
- Enterprise integration – Technical field of enterprise architecture
- Federated database system – System for managing connected databases
- Resource Description Framework – Formal language for describing data models
- Semantic heterogeneity
- Semantic integration – Interrelating info from diverse sources
- Semantic Web – Extension of the Web to facilitate data exchange
- Web 2.0 – Websites that use technology beyond the static pages of the early Internet
- Web services – Service offered between electronic devices via the Internet
