= International Data Spaces Association =

German nonprofit association

International Data Spaces Association (IDSA)
- Company type: Nonprofit organisation
- Industry: Dataspaces
- Founded: 2017
- Headquarters: Dortmund, Germany
- Area served: Worldwide
- Revenue: 2,199,818 (2020)
- Website: https://internationaldataspaces.org

The International Data Spaces Association (IDSA) is a not-for-profit association of more than 140 organisations, incorporated under German law. It creates standards for sharing data in data spaces, that allow participants to have full control over their data.

IDSA was founded in 2016 to create data sharing standards for automated negotiation, exchange, and compliance enforcement. It also defines security standards, control and enforcement mechanisms for data usage, and rules for data traceability. IDSA specifies the legal, operational, functional, and technical agreements between organisations that share data within a data space. It is one of the main initiatives defining the technical specifications for data spaces in the European Union. IDSA releases and maintains a reference architecture model for data spaces. It also certifies the essential software components used in data spaces.

== History ==
In 2014 the Fraunhofer Society started a project called the Industrial Data Space, which was renamed to International Data Spaces (IDS) in 2015. IDSA was formed in 2016 to develop the IDS reference architecture model and certification procedures based on industry requirements.

== Reference architecture model ==
The IDSA reference architecture model, defines the roles and information model for data spaces. The roles include core participants, intermediaries, software and services, and governance. The reference architecture model also defines software connectors that form the interfaces between the data space and its participants. These connectors are used to maintain participants' data sovereignty.

Version 3.0 of IDSA's reference architecture model was released in 2019, and version 4.0 in 2023.

== See also ==
Gaia-X
