= Semantic unification =

Concept in business process modelling

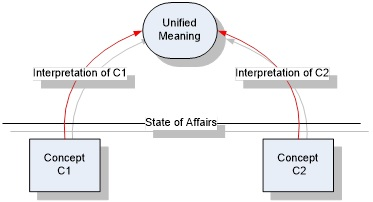
Semantic Matching of concepts

Semantic unification is the process of unifying lexically different concept representations that are judged to have the same semantic content (i.e., meaning). In business processes, the conceptual semantic unification is defined as "the mapping of two expressions onto an expression in an exchange format which is equivalent to the given expression".

Semantic unification has since been applied to the fields of business processes and workflow management. In the early 1990s Charles Petri at Stanford University introduced the term "semantic unification" for business models, later references could be found in and later formalized in Fawsy Bendeck's dissertation. Petri introduced the term 'pragmatic semantic unification" to refer to the approaches in which the results are tested against a running application using the semantic mappings. In this pragmatic approach, the accuracy of the mapping is not as important as its usability.

In general, semantic unification as used in business processes is employed to find a common unified concept that matches two lexicalized expressions into the same interpretation.

== See also ==
- Ontology alignment
- Schema Matching
- Semantic mapper
- Semantic integration
- List of language regulators
- Semantic parsing
- Open Mind Common Sense
- Doublespeak
- Disambiguation
