= Amit Sheth =

Indian-American computer scientist

- Born: Gujarat, India
- Education: Ohio State University, Birla Institute of Technology and Science
- Occupation: Professor at University of South Carolina
- Title: NCR Chair and Professor; Founding Director of the AI Institute of South Carolina
- Website: Amit Sheth

Amit Sheth is an Indian computer scientist who works at University of South Carolina in Columbia, South Carolina. He holds the NCR Chair and is a Professor of Computer Science and Engineering, and is the founding Director of the Artificial Intelligence Institute of South Carolina (AIISC). From 2007 to June 2019, he was the LexisNexis Ohio Eminent Scholar, director of the Ohio Center of Excellence in Knowledge-enabled Computing, and a professor of Computer Science at Wright State University. Sheth's work has been cited by over 64,800 publications. He has an h-index of 122. Research.com ranked him among the top 50 computer science researchers in the United States and top 80 worldwide in its 2022 edition.

== Education ==
Sheth received his bachelor's in engineering from the Birla Institute of Technology and Science in computer science in 1981. He received his M.S. and Ph.D. in computer science from Ohio State University in 1983 and 1985, respectively.

== Research ==
=== Semantics ===
Sheth has investigated and advocated for the comprehensive use of metadata. He explored syntactical, structural, and semantic metadata. He was among the first researchers to utilize description logic-based ontologies for schema and information integration and he was the first to deliver a keynote about Semantic Web applications in search. His work on multi-ontology query processing includes the most cited paper on the topic. In 1996, he introduced the concept of Metadata Reference Link (MREF) for associating metadata to hypertext that links documents on the Web and described an RDF-based realization in 1998. In his work, semantic metadata extracted from biological text is made up of complex knowledge structures that reflect complex interactions in biomedical knowledge. Sheth proposed a realization of Vannevar Bush's MEMEX vision as the Relationship Web, based on the semantic metadata extracted from text. Sheth and his co-inventors were awarded the first known patent for commercial Semantic Web applications in browsing, searching, profiling, personalization, and advertising.

In 1992, he gave a keynote titled "So far (schematically) yet so near (semantically)", which attested to the need for domain-specific semantics, the use of ontological representation for richer semantic modeling/knowledge representation, and the use of context when looking for similarity between objects. His work on using ontologies for information processing encompassed the approach for searching for an ontology-automated reasoning for schema integration, semantic search, other applications, and semantic query processing.

Sheth coauthored a 1995 paper in the Journal of Distributed and Parallel Databases, which is one of the most cited papers in the area of workflow management literature, with more than 2,330 citations. His key technical areas of contribution in workflow management include adaptive workflow management, exception handling, authorization and access control, security, optimization, and quality of service.

=== Information integration ===
Starting in 1987, Sheth gave a number of tutorials at ICDE, VLDB, SIGMOD, and other conferences in the area of distributed (federated) data management and developed scientific foundations and architectural principles to address these issues of database interoperability. He developed a clean reference architecture, covered in his most cited paper on federated databases. Later, he led the development of a schema integration tool in the USA.

Sheth analyzed the limitations resulting from the autonomy of the individual databases and worked towards deep integration by developing specification models for interdatabase dependencies, allowing for a limited degree of coupling to ensure global consistency for critical applications. Together with Dimitrios Georgakopoulos and Marek Rusinkiewicz, he developed the ticketing method for concurrency control of global transactions that need to see and preserve a consistent state across multiple databases.

His work continued in the areas of the integration and interoperability of networked databases in enterprises to Web-based database access. He has also helped to characterize metadata and develop the techniques that extract and use metadata for integrated access to a variety of content, ranging from databases to multimedia/multimodal data.

=== Relationship identification ===
Sheth has been a proponent of identifying a richer and broader set of relationships, such as meronomy and causality, on the Semantic Web. His idea of a "relationship web" is inspired from the vision of memex given by Vannevar Bush. Since the inception of linked data he emphasized the utilization of schema knowledge and the information present on the Web and in linked data for this purpose. These ideas led to a system called BLOOMS for the identification of schema-level relationships between datasets belonging to linked data.

In 1993, he initiated InfoHarness, a system that extracted metadata from diverse content using a Mozilla browser-based faceted search. This system transitioned into a product by Bellcore in 1995 and was followed by a metadata-based search engine for a personal, electronic program guide and Web-based videos for a cable set-top box. In the first keynote on Semantic Web given anywhere, Sheth presented Taalee's commercial implementation of a semantic search engine. "Semantic Enhancement Engine: A Modular Document Enhancement Platform for Semantic Applications over Heterogeneous Content" is one of the earliest publications demonstrating the unusual effectiveness of knowledge-based classifiers compared with more traditional ML techniques. The third component of the system utilized ontology and metadata (annotation) to support semantic search, browsing, profiling, personalization, and advertising.

This system also supported a dynamically generated "Rich Media Reference" which not only displayed metadata about the searched entity pulled from the ontology and metabase but also provided what was termed "blended semantic browsing and querying". He also led efforts in other forms/modality of data, including social and sensor data. He coined the term "Semantic Sensor Web" and initiated and chaired the W3C effort on Semantic Sensor Networking that resulted in a de facto standard. He introduced the concept of semantic perception to reflect the process of converting massive amounts of IoT data into higher level abstractions to support human cognition and perception in decision making, which involves an IntellegO ontology-enabled abductive and deductive reasoning framework for iterative hypothesis refinement and validation.

=== Neurosymbolic AI ===
Since joining the University of South Carolina, Sheth has pursued a research agenda centered on knowledge-empowered neurosymbolic and hybrid AI. He introduced the concept of "Computing for Human Experience," describing how semantics-empowered technologies can enrich and support human activities across physical, cyber, and social domains. His research addresses grounding, alignment, instructability, analogical reasoning, interpretability, explainability, and trustworthy AI, as well as multimodal and conversational AI. Among the research concepts he introduced is Knowledge-infused Learning, a framework for integrating external knowledge into machine learning to improve interpretability and safety. He has also introduced the terms Smart Data, Citizen Sensing, Semantic Perception, and Augmented Personalized Health. AIISC has conducted interdisciplinary research spanning digital and connected health, mental health and wellbeing, biomedical informatics, smart manufacturing, education, and the mitigation of online disinformation and radicalization, with research partnerships across eight colleges and schools at the university.

=== Social media analytics ===
In early 2009, he initiated and framed the issue of social media analysis in a broad set of semantic dimensions he called "Spatio-Temporal-Thematic" (STT). He emphasised the analysis of social data from the perspective of people, content, sentiment analysis and emotions. This idea led to a system called Twitris, which employs dynamically evolving semantic models produced by the Semantic Web project Doozer for this purpose. Twitris system can identify people's emotions from their social media posts by applying machine learning techniques with millions of self-labeled emotion tweets.

=== Editing ===
Sheth served as the founding editor-in-chief of the International Journal on Semantic Web and Information Systems (IJSWIS), published by IGI Global, from its establishment in 2005. He also served as joint editor-in-chief of Distributed and Parallel Databases (DAPD) and is a co-editor of two Springer book series.

== Entrepreneurship ==
Sheth founded Infocosm, Inc. in 1997, which licensed and commercialized the METEOR technology from the research he led at the University of Georgia, resulting in distributed workflow management products, WebWork and ORBWork. He founded Taalee, Inc. in 1999 based on licensing VideoAnywhere technology based on the research he led at the University of Georgia. The first product from Taalee was a semantic search engine. Taalee became Voquette after merger in 2002, and then Semagix in 2004. In 2016, Cognovi Labs was founded based on the Twitris technology resulting from the research he led at the Kno.e.sis Center of the Wright State University. He also served as its chief innovator and serves on the board. The technology was successfully used to predict Brexit and the US 2016 presidential election.

== Awards ==
- Distinguished Alumnus Award, Birla Institute of Technology and Science, 2025, presented at the BITS Pilani Convocation on 13 July 2025; he was concurrently appointed Distinguished Adjunct Professor at BITS Pilani.
- IEEE Computer Society W. Wallace McDowell Award 2023 "For pioneering and enduring contributions to information integration, data and service semantics, and knowledge-enhanced computing."
- Selected 2020 ACM Fellow "For contributions to data semantics and knowledge-enhanced computing."
- IEEE TCSVC Research Innovation Award, "in recognition of his pioneering and enduring research, applications and adoption of distributed workflow processes and semantics in services computing," 2020.
- Distinguished Alumni Award for Academic Excellence, College of Engineering, Ohio State University, 2019.
- Elected AAAS Fellow (Class of 2018) for his pioneering and enduring contributions on information integration, distributed workflow, and semantics and knowledge-based big data analytics.
- Elected AAAI Fellow (Class of 2018) for significant and enduring contribution to semantics and knowledge-based techniques to transform diverse data into insights and actions.
- 2017 Ohio Faculty Council Technology Commercialization Award (runner-up).
- Elected IEEE Fellow (Class of 2006) for contributions to information integration and workflow management.
- Received the Trustees Award for Faculty Excellence, the highest award given by Wright State University.
- IBM Faculty Award 2004.
