= Universal relation assumption =

Database theory

The universal relation assumption in relational databases states that one can place all data attributes into a (possibly very wide) table, which may then be decomposed into smaller tables as needed.

However, the assumption that a single large table can capture real database designs is often plagued with a number of difficulties. The "nested universal relation" model has attempted to address some of the problems and offer improvements.
