= Heterogeneous database system =

A heterogeneous database system is an automated (or semi-automated) system for the integration of heterogeneous, disparate database management systems to present a user with a single, unified query interface.

Heterogeneous database systems (HDBs) are computational models and software implementations that provide heterogeneous database integration.

== Problems of heterogeneous database integration ==
This article does not contain details of distributed database management systems (sometimes known as federated database systems).

=== Technical heterogeneity ===
Different file formats, access protocols, query languages etc. Often called syntactic heterogeneity from the point of view of data.

=== Data model heterogeneity ===
Different ways of representing and storing the same data. Table decompositions may vary, column names (data labels) may be different (but have the same semantics), data encoding schemes may vary (i.e., should a measurement scale be explicitly included in a field or should it be implied elsewhere). Also referred as schematic heterogeneity.

=== Semantic heterogeneity ===
Data across constituent databases may be related but different. Perhaps a database system must be able to integrate genomic and proteomic data. They are related—a gene may have several protein products—but the data are different (nucleotide sequences and amino acid sequences, or hydrophilic or -phobic amino acid sequence and positively or negatively charged amino acids). There may be many ways of looking at semantically similar, but distinct, datasets.

The system may also be required to present "new" knowledge to the user. Relationships may be inferred between data according to rules specified in domain ontologies.

== See also ==
- Big data
- Expert system
- Knowledge base
- Ontology
