= Integration Consortium =

The Integration Consortium (IC) is a global non-profit organisation and community that shares knowledge and best practices related to enterprise application integration. The mission of the IC is support Information Technology professionals responsible for transforming business through both traditional systems integration and emerging SOA with improved business results.

Members of the IC use Collaborative Networked Learning methods to advance integration disciplines including:

- a dynamic website which supports blogs, wikis and forums
- a document repository for white-papers and industry research
- regular meetings of local chapters to share knowledge in unstructured forums
- regional conferences or global summits featuring multi-day structured programs
- collaborating with standards organizations to provide a real-world practitioner perspective
- collaborating with educational institutions to promote research and formal peer-reviewed methods

Members of the IC include end user corporations, independent software suppliers, hardware suppliers, system integrators, academic institutions, non-profit institutions, and individual members.

== History of IC ==
The Integration Consortium was first established as the Enterprise Application Integration (EAI) Consortium and was incorporated in 2001 as a non-profit organization in Alberta, Canada. The organization was renamed as the Integration Consortium in 2005 and subsequently moved its operations to the U.S. and incorporated as a non-profit in Delaware in 2006. Beginning in 2004, the IC has held an annual call for papers (CFP) in order to uncover emerging integration practices and to identify integration thought leaders and practice leaders. Submitted papers that pass a peer review process are published in an annual Integration Journal. The 2004 through 2007 publications include over 100 white-papers and case studies. Papers may be submitted by members or non-members. The Integration Journal is the first open peer-reviewed publication on the topic of integration outside of strictly academic institutions.

The concept of integration as a competency in the IT domain began in the mid-1990s with advent of middleware technology. It has now matured for over 10 years and appears to be picking up momentum and broad-based acceptance as evidenced by the programs of educational institutions. Universities are beginning to include integration topics in their MBA programs and Computer Science curricula. For example, The College of Information Sciences and Technology at Penn State University has established an Enterprise Informatics and Integration Center with the following mission: The Enterprise Informatics and Integration Center (EI²) will actively engage industry, non-profit, and government agency leaders to address critical issues in enterprise processes, knowledge management, and decision making.
