= IEEE Internet of Things Journal =

Academic journal on Internet of Things

- Discipline: Internet of things
- Language: English
- Edited by: Honggang Wang

Publication details
- History: 2014-present
- Publisher: Institute of Electrical and Electronics Engineers
- Frequency: Bimonthly
- Impact factor: 9.936 (2020)

Standard abbreviations
- ISO 4: IEEE Internet Things J.

Indexing
- ISSN: 2327-4662
- OCLC no.: 1224066553

Links
- Journal homepage; Online access; Online archive

The IEEE Internet of Things Journal is a bimonthly peer-reviewed scientific journal published by the IEEE on behalf of the IEEE Sensors Council, IEEE Communications Society, IEEE Computer Society, and IEEE Signal Processing Society. It covers research on the Internet of things. The journal was established in 2004 and the editor-in-chief is Honggang Wang (University of Massachusetts Dartmouth).

== Abstracting and indexing ==
The journal is abstracted and indexed in:

- Current Contents/Engineering, Computing & Technology
- Ei Compendex
- Inspec
- ProQuest databases
- Science Citation Index Expanded
- Scopus

According to the Journal Citation Reports, the journal has a 2020 impact factor of 9.936.
