= Ontology alignment =

Process of determining correspondences between concepts in ontologies

Ontology alignment, or ontology matching, is the process of determining correspondences between concepts in ontologies. A set of correspondences is also called an alignment. The phrase takes on a slightly different meaning, in computer science, cognitive science or philosophy.

== Computer science ==
For computer scientists, concepts are expressed as labels for data. Historically, the need for ontology alignment arose out of the need to integrate heterogeneous databases, ones developed independently and thus each having their own data vocabulary. In the Semantic Web context involving many actors providing their own ontologies, ontology matching has taken a critical place for helping heterogeneous resources to interoperate. Ontology alignment tools find classes of data that are semantically equivalent, for example, "truck" and "lorry". The classes are not necessarily logically identical. According to Euzenat and Shvaiko (2007), there are three major dimensions for similarity: syntactic, external, and semantic. Coincidentally, they roughly correspond to the dimensions identified by Cognitive Scientists below. A number of tools and frameworks have been developed for aligning ontologies, some with inspiration from Cognitive Science and some independently.

Ontology alignment tools have generally been developed to operate on database schemas, XML schemas, taxonomies, formal languages, entity-relationship models, dictionaries, and other label frameworks. They are usually converted to a graph representation before being matched. Since the emergence of the Semantic Web, such graphs can be represented in the Resource Description Framework line of languages by triples of the form <subject, predicate, object>, as illustrated in the Notation 3 syntax. In this context, aligning ontologies is sometimes referred to as "ontology matching".

The problem of Ontology Alignment has been tackled recently by trying to compute matching first and mapping (based on the matching) in an automatic fashion. Systems like DSSim, X-SOM or COMA++ obtained at the moment very high precision and recall. The Ontology Alignment Evaluation Initiative aims to evaluate, compare and improve the different approaches.

=== Formal definition ===
Given two ontologies $i=\langle C_{i}, R_{i}, I_{i}, T_{i}, V_{i}\rangle$ and $j=\langle C_{j}, R_{j}, I_{j}, T_{j}, V_{j}\rangle$ where $C$ is the set of classes, $R$ is the set of relations, $I$ is the set of individuals, $T$ is the set of data types, and $V$ is the set of values, we can define different types of (inter-ontology) relationships. Such relationships will be called, all together, alignments and can be categorized among different dimensions:

- similarity vs logic: this is the difference between matchings (predicating about the similarity of ontology terms), and mappings (logical axioms, typically expressing logical equivalence or inclusion among ontology terms)
- atomic vs complex: whether the alignments we considered are one-to-one, or can involve more terms in a query-like formulation (e.g., LAV/GAV mapping)
- homogeneous vs heterogeneous: do the alignments predicate on terms of the same type (e.g., classes are related only to classes, individuals to individuals, etc.) or we allow heterogeneity in the relationship?
- type of alignment: the semantics associated to an alignment. It can be subsumption, equivalence, disjointness, part-of or any user-specified relationship.

Subsumption, atomic, homogeneous alignments are the building blocks to obtain richer alignments, and have a well defined semantics in every Description Logic. Let's now introduce more formally ontology matching and mapping.

An atomic homogeneous matching is an alignment that carries a similarity degree $s\in [0,1]$, describing the similarity of two terms of the input ontologies $i$ and $j$. Matching can be either computed, by means of heuristic algorithms, or inferred from other matchings.

Formally we can say that, a matching is a quadruple $m=\langle id, t_{i}, t_{j}, s\rangle$, where $t_{i}$ and $t_{j}$ are homogeneous ontology terms, $s$ is the similarity degree of $m$. A (subsumption, homogeneous, atomic) mapping is defined as a pair $\mu=\langle t_{i}, t_{j}\rangle$, where $t_{i}$ and $t_{j}$ are homogeneous ontology terms.

== Cognitive science ==
For cognitive scientists interested in ontology alignment, the "concepts" are nodes in a semantic network that reside in brains as "conceptual systems." The focal question is: if everyone has unique experiences and thus different semantic networks, then how can we ever understand each other? This question has been addressed by a model called ABSURDIST (Aligning Between Systems Using Relations Derived Inside Systems for Translation). Three major dimensions have been identified for similarity as equations for "internal similarity, external similarity, and mutual inhibition."

== Ontology alignment methods ==
Two sub research fields have emerged in ontology mapping, namely monolingual ontology mapping and cross-lingual ontology mapping. The former refers to the mapping of ontologies in the same natural language, whereas the latter refers to "the process of establishing relationships among ontological resources from two or more independent ontologies where each ontology is labelled in a different natural language". Existing matching methods in monolingual ontology mapping are discussed in Euzenat and Shvaiko (2007). Approaches to cross-lingual ontology mapping are presented in Fu et al. (2011).

== See also ==
- Data conversion
- Graph isomorphism
- Minimal mappings
- Ontology (information science)
- Rule Interchange Format
- Semantic heterogeneity
- Semantic integration
- Semantic interoperability
- Semantic matching
- Semantic unification
