= Semantic equivalence =

Concept in computer metadata

In computer metadata, semantic equivalence is a declaration that two data elements from different vocabularies contain data that has similar meaning. There are three types of semantic equivalence statements:

- Class or concept equivalence. A statement that two high level concepts have similar or equivalent meaning.
- Property or attribute equivalence. A statement that two properties, descriptors or attributes of classes have similar meaning.
- Instance equivalence. A statement that two instances of data are the same or refer to the same instance.

== Example ==
Assume that there are two organizations, each having a separate data dictionary. The first organization has a data element entry:

 <DataElement>
    <Name>PersonFamilyName</Name>
    <Definition>The family name of a person shared with other members of their family.</Definition>
 <DataElement>

and a second organization has a data dictionary with a data element with the following entry:

 <DataElement>
    <Name>IndividualLastName</Name>
    <Definition>The name of an individual person shared with other members of their family.</Definition>
 <DataElement>

these two data elements can be considered to have the same meaning and can be marked as semantically equivalent.

== See also ==
- Logical equivalence
- Metadata
- Vocabulary-based transformation
- Web Ontology Language (OWL)
