= Semantic integration =

Interrelating info from diverse sources

Semantic integration is the process of interrelating information from diverse sources, for example calendars and to do lists, email archives, presence information (physical, psychological, and social), documents of all sorts, contacts (including social graphs), search results, and advertising and marketing relevance derived from them. In this regard, semantics focuses on the organization of and action upon information by acting as an intermediary between heterogeneous data sources, which may conflict not only by structure but also context or value.

== Applications and methods ==
In enterprise application integration (EAI), semantic integration can facilitate or even automate the communication between computer systems using metadata publishing. Metadata publishing potentially offers the ability to automatically link ontologies. One approach to (semi-)automated ontology mapping requires the definition of a semantic distance or its inverse, semantic similarity and appropriate rules. Other approaches include so-called lexical methods, as well as methodologies that rely on exploiting the structures of the ontologies. For explicitly stating similarity/equality, there exist special properties or relationships in most ontology languages. OWL, for example has "owl:equivalentClass", "owl:equivalentProperty" and "owl:sameAs".

Eventually system designs may see the advent of composable architectures where published semantic-based interfaces are joined together to enable new and meaningful capabilities. These could predominately be described by means of design-time declarative specifications, that could ultimately be rendered and executed at run-time.

Semantic integration can also be used to facilitate design-time activities of interface design and mapping. In this model, semantics are only explicitly applied to design and the run-time systems work at the syntax level. This "early semantic binding" approach can improve overall system performance while retaining the benefits of semantic driven design.

== Semantic integration situations ==
From the industry use case, it has been observed that the semantic mappings were performed only within the scope of the ontology class or the datatype property. These identified semantic integrations are (1) integration of ontology class instances into another ontology class without any constraint, (2) integration of selected instances in one ontology class into another ontology class by the range constraint of the property value and (3) integration of ontology class instances into another ontology class with the value transformation of the instance property. Each of them requires a particular mapping relationship, which is respectively: (1) equivalent or subsumption mapping relationship, (2) conditional mapping relationship that constraints the value of property (data range) and (3) transformation mapping relationship that transforms the value of property (unit transformation). Each identified mapping relationship can be defined as either (1) direct mapping type, (2) data range mapping type or (3) unit transformation mapping type.

== KG vs. RDB approaches ==
In the case of integrating supplemental data source,

- KG (knowledge graph) formally represents the meaning involved in information by describing concepts, relationships between things, and categories of things. These embedded semantics with the data offer significant advantages such as reasoning over data and dealing with heterogeneous data sources. The rules can be applied on KG more efficiently using graph query. For example, the graph query does the data inference through the connected relations, instead of repeated full search of the tables in relational database. KG facilitates the integration of new heterogeneous data by just adding new relationships between existing information and new entities. This facilitation is emphasized for the integration with existing popular linked open data source such as Wikidata.org.
- SQL query is tightly coupled and rigidly constrained by datatype within the specific database and can join tables and extract data from tables, and the result is generally a table, and a query can join tables by any columns which match by datatype. SPARQL query is the standard query language and protocol for Linked Open Data on the web and loosely coupled with the database so that it facilitates the reusability and can extract data through the relations free from the datatype, and not only extract but also generate additional knowledge graph with more sophisticated operations(logic: transitive/symmetric/inverseOf/functional). The inference based query (query on the existing asserted facts without the generation of new facts by logic) can be fast comparing to the reasoning based query (query on the existing plus the generated/discovered facts based on logic).
- The information integration of heterogeneous data sources in traditional database is intricate, which requires the redesign of the database table such as changing the structure and/or addition of new data. In the case of semantic query, SPARQL query reflects the relationships between entities in a way that aligned with human's understanding of the domain, so the semantic intention of the query can be seen on the query itself. Unlike SPARQL, SQL query, which reflects the specific structure of the database and derived from matching the relevant primary and foreign keys of tables, loses the semantics of the query by missing the relationships between entities. Below is the example that compares SPARQL and SQL queries for medications that treats "TB of vertebra".

SELECT ?medication
WHERE {
?diagnosis a example:Diagnosis .
?diagnosis example:name “TB of vertebra” .
?medication example:canTreat ?diagnosis .
}

SELECT DRUG.medID
FROM DIAGNOSIS, DRUG, DRUG_DIAGNOSIS
WHERE DIAGNOSIS.diagnosisID=DRUG_DIAGNOSIS.diagnosisID
AND DRUG.medID=DRUG_DIAGNOSIS.medID
AND DIAGNOSIS.name=”TB of vertebra”

== Examples ==
The Pacific Symposium on Biocomputing has been a venue for the popularization of the ontology mapping task in the biomedical domain, and a number of papers on the subject can be found in its proceedings.

== See also ==
- Data integration
- Dataspaces
- Enterprise integration
- Ontology-based data integration
- Ontology alignment
- Ontology engineering
- Ontology matching
- Semantic heterogeneity
- Semantic technology
- Semantic translation
- Semantic unification
