= Linear probing =

Computer programming method for hashing

The collision between John Smith and Sandra Dee (both hashing to cell 873) is resolved by placing Sandra Dee at the next free location, cell 874.

Linear probing is a scheme in computer programming for resolving collisions in hash tables, data structures for maintaining a collection of key–value pairs and looking up the value associated with a given key. It was invented in 1954 by Gene Amdahl, Elaine M. McGraw, and Arthur Samuel (and, independently, by Andrey Yershov) and first analyzed in 1963 by Donald Knuth.

Along with quadratic probing and double hashing, linear probing is a form of open addressing. In these schemes, each cell of a hash table stores a single key–value pair. When the hash function causes a collision by mapping a new key to a cell of the hash table that is already occupied by another key, linear probing searches the table for the closest following free location and inserts the new key there. Lookups are performed in the same way, by searching the table sequentially starting at the position given by the hash function, until finding a cell with a matching key or an empty cell.

As Thorup & Zhang (2012) write, "Hash tables are the most commonly used nontrivial data structures, and the most popular implementation on standard hardware uses linear probing, which is both fast and simple." Linear probing can provide high performance because of its good locality of reference, but is more sensitive to the quality of its hash function than some other collision resolution schemes. It takes constant expected time per search, insertion, or deletion when implemented using a random hash function, a 5-independent hash function, or tabulation hashing. Good results can also be achieved in practice with other hash functions such as MurmurHash.

== Operations ==
Linear probing is a component of open addressing schemes for using a hash table to solve the dictionary problem. In the dictionary problem, a data structure should maintain a collection of key–value pairs subject to operations that insert or delete pairs from the collection or that search for the value associated with a given key. In open addressing solutions to this problem, the data structure is an array T (the hash table) whose cells T[i] (when nonempty) each store a single key–value pair. A hash function is used to map each key into the cell of T where that key should be stored, typically scrambling the keys so that keys with similar values are not placed near each other in the table. A hash collision occurs when the hash function maps a key into a cell that is already occupied by a different key. Linear probing is a strategy for resolving collisions, by placing the new key into the closest following empty cell.

=== Search ===
To search for a given key x, the cells of T are examined, beginning with the cell at index h(x) (where h is the hash function) and continuing to the adjacent cells h(x) + 1, h(x) + 2, ..., until finding either an empty cell or a cell whose stored key is x. If a cell containing the key is found, the search returns the value from that cell. Otherwise, if an empty cell is found, the key cannot be in the table, because it would have been placed in that cell in preference to any later cell that has not yet been searched. In this case, the search returns as its result that the key is not present in the dictionary.

=== Insertion ===
To insert a key–value pair (x,v) into the table (possibly replacing any existing pair with the same key), the insertion algorithm follows the same sequence of cells that would be followed for a search, until finding either an empty cell or a cell whose stored key is x. The new key–value pair is then placed into that cell.

If the insertion would cause the load factor of the table (its fraction of occupied cells) to grow above some preset threshold, the whole table may be replaced by a new table, larger by a constant factor, with a new hash function, as in a dynamic array. Setting this threshold close to zero and using a high growth rate for the table size leads to faster hash table operations but greater memory usage than threshold values close to one and low growth rates. A common choice would be to double the table size when the load factor would exceed 1/2, causing the load factor to stay between 1/4 and 1/2.

=== Deletion ===
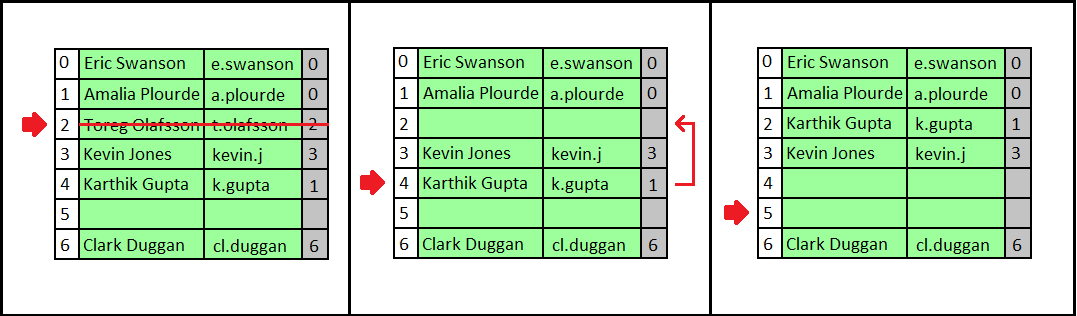
When a key–value pair is deleted, it may be necessary to move another pair backwards into its cell, to prevent searches for the moved key from finding an empty cell.

It is also possible to remove a key–value pair from the dictionary. However, it is not sufficient to do so by simply emptying its cell. This would affect searches for other keys that have a hash value earlier than the emptied cell, but that are stored in a position later than the emptied cell. The emptied cell would cause those searches to incorrectly report that the key is not present.

Instead, when a cell i is emptied, it is necessary to search forward through the following cells of the table until finding either another empty cell or a key that can be moved to cell i (that is, a key whose hash value is equal to or earlier than i). When an empty cell is found, then emptying cell i is safe and the deletion process terminates. But, when the search finds a key that can be moved to cell i, it performs this move. This has the effect of speeding up later searches for the moved key, but it also empties out another cell, later in the same block of occupied cells. The search for a movable key continues for the new emptied cell, in the same way, until it terminates by reaching a cell that was already empty. In this process of moving keys to earlier cells, each key is examined only once. Therefore, the time to complete the whole process is proportional to the length of the block of occupied cells containing the deleted key, matching the running time of the other hash table operations.

Alternatively, it is possible to use a lazy deletion strategy in which a key–value pair is removed by replacing the value by a special flag value indicating a deleted key. However, these flag values will contribute to the load factor of the hash table. With this strategy, it may become necessary to clean the flag values out of the array and rehash all the remaining key–value pairs once too large a fraction of the array becomes occupied by deleted keys.

== Properties ==
Linear probing provides good locality of reference, which causes it to require few uncached memory accesses per operation. Because of this, for low to moderate load factors, it can provide very high performance. However, compared to some other open addressing strategies, its performance degrades more quickly at high load factors because of primary clustering, a tendency for one collision to cause more nearby collisions. Additionally, achieving good performance with this method requires a higher-quality hash function than for some other collision resolution schemes. When used with low-quality hash functions that fail to eliminate nonuniformities in the input distribution, linear probing can be slower than other open-addressing strategies such as double hashing, which probes a sequence of cells whose separation is determined by a second hash function, or quadratic probing, where the size of each step varies depending on its position within the probe sequence.

== Analysis ==
Using linear probing, dictionary operations can be implemented in constant expected time. In other words, insert, remove and search operations can be implemented in O(1), as long as the load factor of the hash table is a constant strictly less than one.

In more detail, the time for any particular operation (a search, insertion, or deletion) is proportional to the length of the contiguous block of occupied cells at which the operation starts. If all starting cells are equally likely, in a hash table with N cells, then a maximal block of k occupied cells will have probability k/N of containing the starting location of a search, and will take time O(k) whenever it is the starting location. Therefore, the expected time for an operation can be calculated as the product of these two terms, O(k^{2}/N), summed over all of the maximal blocks of contiguous cells in the table. A similar sum of squared block lengths gives the expected time bound for a random hash function (rather than for a random starting location into a specific state of the hash table), by summing over all the blocks that could exist (rather than the ones that actually exist in a given state of the table), and multiplying the term for each potential block by the probability that the block is actually occupied. That is, defining Block(i,k) to be the event that there is a maximal contiguous block of occupied cells of length k beginning at index i, the expected time per operation is

$$E[T] = O(1) + \sum_{i=1}^N \sum_{k=1}^n O(k^2/N) \operatorname{Pr}[\operatorname{Block}(i,k)].$$

This formula can be simplified by replacing Block(i,k) by a simpler necessary condition Full(k), the event that at least k elements have hash values that lie within a block of cells of length k. After this replacement, the value within the sum no longer depends on i, and the 1/N factor cancels the N terms of the outer summation. These simplifications lead to the bound

$$E[T] \le O(1) + \sum_{k=1}^n O(k^2) \operatorname{Pr}[\operatorname{Full}(k)].$$

But by the multiplicative form of the Chernoff bound, when the load factor is bounded away from one, the probability that a block of length k contains at least k hashed values is exponentially small as a function of k, causing this sum to be bounded by a constant independent of n. It is also possible to perform the same analysis using Stirling's approximation instead of the Chernoff bound to estimate the probability that a block contains exactly k hashed values.

In terms of the load factor α, the expected time to perform a successful search on a random key is O(1 + 1/(1 − α)), and the expected time to perform an unsuccessful search (or the insertion of a new key) is O(1 + 1/(1 − α)^{2}). For constant load factors, with high probability, the longest probe sequence (among the probe sequences for all keys stored in the table) has logarithmic length.

== Primary clustering ==
Linear probing hash tables suffer from a problem known as primary clustering, in which elements to group together into long contiguous runs. In terms of the load factor α, the expected length of the run containing a given element is $\Theta(1 + 1/(1 - \alpha)^2)$. This is why insertions take time $\Theta(1 + 1/(1 - \alpha)^2)$, as opposed to the running time of $\Theta(1 + 1/(1 - \alpha))$ achieved by other open-addressed hash tables such as uniform probing and double hashing. Primary clustering also affects unsuccessful searches, since like insertions, they must travel to the end of a run. Some variations of linear probing are able to achieve better bounds for unsuccessful searches and insertions, by using techniques that reduce primary clustering.

== Choice of hash function ==
Because linear probing is especially sensitive to unevenly distributed hash values, it is important to combine it with a high-quality hash function that does not produce such irregularities.

The analysis above assumes that each key's hash is a random number independent of the hashes of all the other keys. This assumption is unrealistic for most applications of hashing. However, random or pseudorandom hash values may be used when hashing objects by their identity rather than by their value. For instance, this is done using linear probing by the IdentityHashMap class of the Java collections framework. The hash value that this class associates with each object, its identityHashCode, is guaranteed to remain fixed for the lifetime of an object but is otherwise arbitrary. Because the identityHashCode is constructed only once per object, and is not required to be related to the object's address or value, its construction may involve slower computations such as the call to a random or pseudorandom number generator. For instance, Java 8 uses an Xorshift pseudorandom number generator to construct these values.

For most applications of hashing, it is necessary to compute the hash function for each value every time that it is hashed, rather than once when its object is created. In such applications, random or pseudorandom numbers cannot be used as hash values, because then different objects with the same value would have different hashes. And cryptographic hash functions (which are designed to be computationally indistinguishable from truly random functions) are usually too slow to be used in hash tables. Instead, other methods for constructing hash functions have been devised. These methods compute the hash function quickly, and can be proven to work well with linear probing. In particular, linear probing has been analyzed from the framework of k-independent hashing, a class of hash functions that are initialized from a small random seed and that are equally likely to map any k-tuple of distinct keys to any k-tuple of indexes. The parameter k can be thought of as a measure of hash function quality: the larger k is, the more time it will take to compute the hash function but it will behave more similarly to completely random functions. For linear probing, 5-independence is enough to guarantee constant expected time per operation, while some 4-independent hash functions perform badly, taking up to logarithmic time per operation.

Another method of constructing hash functions with both high quality and practical speed is tabulation hashing. In this method, the hash value for a key is computed by using each byte of the key as an index into a table of random numbers (with a different table for each byte position). The numbers from those table cells are then combined by a bitwise exclusive or operation. Hash functions constructed this way are only 3-independent. Nevertheless, linear probing using these hash functions takes constant expected time per operation. Both tabulation hashing and standard methods for generating 5-independent hash functions are limited to keys that have a fixed number of bits. To handle strings or other types of variable-length keys, it is possible to compose a simpler universal hashing technique that maps the keys to intermediate values and a higher quality (5-independent or tabulation) hash function that maps the intermediate values to hash table indices.

In an experimental comparison, Richter et al. found that the Multiply-Shift family of hash functions (defined as $h_z(x) = (x \cdot z \bmod 2^w) \div 2^{w-d}$) was "the fastest hash function when integrated with all hashing schemes, i.e., producing the highest throughputs and also of good quality" whereas tabulation hashing produced "the lowest throughput". They point out that each table look-up require several cycles, being more expensive than simple arithmetic operations. They also found MurmurHash to be superior than tabulation hashing: "By studying the results provided by Mult and Murmur, we think that the trade-off for by tabulation (...) is less attractive in practice".

== History ==
The idea of an associative array that allows data to be accessed by its value rather than by its address dates back to the mid-1940s in the work of Konrad Zuse and Vannevar Bush, but hash tables were not described until 1953, in an IBM memorandum by Hans Peter Luhn. Luhn used a different collision resolution method, chaining, rather than linear probing.

Knuth (1963) summarizes the early history of linear probing. It was the first open addressing method, and was originally synonymous with open addressing. According to Knuth, it was first used by Gene Amdahl, Elaine M. McGraw (née Boehme), and Arthur Samuel in 1954, in an assembler program for the IBM 701 computer. The first published description of linear probing is by Peterson (1957), who also credits Samuel, Amdahl, and Boehme but adds that "the system is so natural, that it very likely may have been conceived independently by others either before or since that time". Another early publication of this method was by Soviet researcher Andrey Ershov, in 1958.

The first theoretical analysis of linear probing, showing that it takes constant expected time per operation with random hash functions, was given by Knuth. Sedgewick calls Knuth's work "a landmark in the analysis of algorithms". Knuth's original analysis was never formally published, and the first published analysis was due to Konheim and Weiss in 1966.

Knuth's analysis disproved an earlier conjecture by Peterson that, at load factor $\alpha = 1 - \varepsilon$, the expected time per insertion should be $\Theta(1 + \varepsilon^{-1})$. Knuth showed instead that the time per operation grows as at a rate of $\Theta(1 + \varepsilon^{-2})$. This effect, in which the insertion time grows quadratically faster than one might intuitively guess, became known as primary clustering. Subsequent work has introduced several algorithmic techniques to reduce primary clustering, including a variation of linear probing known as graveyard hashing that achieves the ideal bound of $\Theta(1 + \varepsilon^{-1})$.

Other later developments include a more detailed analysis of the probability distribution of the running time, amortized analyses for workloads with both insertions and deletions, and analyses of linear probing using explicit families of hash functions.
