= Arnold Dumey =

American engineer

Arnold I. Dumey (1906-1995) was the co-inventor of the postal sorting machine and cryptanalyst first for SIS and then NSA. During World War II he worked for the Army Signal Corps and at Arlington Hall, headquarters of the US Army's Signals Intelligence Service (SIS) cryptography, under William and Elizabeth Friedman on breaking the German and Japanese codes. Dumey is also considered by some the inventor of hashing. He published the first hashing paper in 1956.

Later, as a consultant, he co-invented the postal sorter and wrote the code that is used on the front of all USPS envelopes and packages in order to facilitate delivery. In addition, he developed the first system to charge theater tickets to a credit card over the phone for the League of NY Theaters.

The "Dumey microsecond" is a term of art in the intelligence community of the United States where Dumey spent much of his career. The Dumey microsecond was a crucial event that Arnold claimed was common to all projects: It is that microsecond during which you can impact the flow of, or design of, a project. Before this microsecond, it is too early. After, it is too late to have an impact.

Through the early 1970s, Dumey, then working for the IDA Communications Research Division in Princeton, was the longest-serving member in the history of the NSA scientific advisory board.
