= Arthur Samuel (computer scientist) =

American computer scientist (1901–1990)

- Born: Arthur Lee Samuel; December 5, 1901; Emporia, Kansas, U.S.
- Died: July 29, 1990 (aged 88); Stanford, California, U.S.
- Education: College of Emporia; Massachusetts Institute of Technology (MSc)
- Known for: Samuel Checkers-playing Program; Early implementation of Alpha–beta pruning; Coining machine learning; Contributions to TeX project
- Awards: Computer Pioneer Award (1987)
- Scientific career
- Fields: Computer science
- Workplaces: Bell Laboratories (1928); University of Illinois (1946); IBM (1949); Stanford University (1966)

Arthur Lee Samuel (December 5, 1901 – July 29, 1990) was an American computer scientist and pioneer in the field of computer gaming and artificial intelligence. He coined the term machine learning in 1959. The Samuel Checkers-playing Program was among the world's first successful self-learning programs, and as such a very early demonstration of the fundamental concept of artificial intelligence. He was also a senior member in the TeX community who devoted much time giving personal attention to the needs of users and wrote an early TeX manual in 1983.

== Biography ==
Arthur Lee Samuel was born on December 5, 1901, in Emporia, Kansas, and graduated from the College of Emporia in Kansas in 1923. He received a master's degree in Electrical Engineering from MIT in 1926, and taught for two years as an instructor. In 1928, he joined Bell Laboratories, where he worked mostly on vacuum tubes, including improvements of radar during World War II. He developed a gas-discharge transmit-receive switch (TR tube) that allowed a single antenna to be used for both transmitting and receiving. After the war he moved to the University of Illinois at Urbana–Champaign to become a Professor of Electrical Engineering, where he initiated the ILLIAC project, but left before its first computer was complete.

Samuel went to IBM in Poughkeepsie, New York, in 1949, where he would conceive and carry out his most successful work. He is credited with one of the first software hash tables, and influencing early research in using transistors for computers at IBM. At IBM he made the first checkers program on IBM's first commercial computer, the IBM 701. The program was a sensational demonstration of the advances in both hardware and skilled programming and caused IBM's stock to increase 15 points overnight. His pioneering non-numerical programming helped shape the instruction set of processors, as he was one of the first to work with computers on projects other than computation. He was known for writing articles that made complex subjects easy to understand. He was chosen to write an introduction to one of the earliest journals devoted to computing in 1953.

In 1966, Samuel retired from IBM and became a professor at Stanford University, where he worked the remainder of his life. He worked with Donald Knuth on the TeX project, including writing some of the documentation. He continued to write software past his 88th birthday.

He received the Computer Pioneer Award from the IEEE Computer Society in 1987. Samuel died of complications from Parkinson's disease on July 29, 1990.

== Computer checkers (draughts) development ==
Samuel is most known within the AI community for his groundbreaking work in computer checkers in 1959, and seminal research on machine learning, beginning in 1949. He graduated from MIT and taught at MIT and UIUC from 1946 to 1949. He believed teaching computers to play games was very fruitful for developing tactics appropriate to general problems, and he chose checkers as it is relatively simple though has a depth of strategy. The main driver of the machine was a search tree of the board positions reachable from the current state. Since he had only a very limited amount of available computer memory, Samuel implemented what is now called alpha–beta pruning. Instead of searching each path until reaching the game's conclusion, Samuel developed a scoring function based on the position of the board at any given time. This function tried to measure the chance of winning for each side at the given position, taking into account elements such as the number of pieces on each side, the number of kings, and the proximity of pieces to being "kinged." The program chose its move based on a minimax strategy, meaning it made the move that optimized the value of this function, assuming that the opponent was trying to optimize the value of the same function from its point of view.

Samuel also designed various mechanisms by which his program could become better. In what he called rote learning, the program remembered every position it had already seen, along with the terminal value of the reward function. This technique effectively extended the search depth at each of these positions. Samuel's later programs reevaluated the reward function based on input from professional games. He also had it play thousands of games against itself as another way of learning. With all of this work, Samuel's program reached a respectable amateur status and was the first to play any board game at this high a level. He continued to work on checkers until the mid-1970s, at which point his program achieved sufficient skill to challenge a respectable amateur.

== Awards ==
- 1990 — Founding Fellow of the Association for the Advancement of Artificial Intelligence
- 1987 — Computer Pioneer Award, for adaptive non-numeric processing

== Selected works ==
- Computing bit by bit, or Digital computers made easy (1953). Proceedings of the Institute of Radio Engineers 41, 1223-1230.
- Samuel, A. L. (2000). "Some studies in machine learning using the game of checkers". IBM Journal of Research and Development. 44. IBM: 206–226. doi:10.1147/rd.441.0206.

Reprinted with an additional annotated game in Computers and Thought, edited by Edward Feigenbaum and Julian Feldman (New York: McGraw-Hill, 1963), 71-105.

- 1983. First Grade TeX: A Beginner's TeX Manual. Stanford Computer Science Report STAN-CS-83-985 (November 1983).
