= Charlotte Davis =

Charlotte Davis may refer to:

- Charlotte Kasl (1938–2021), née Davis, American psychologist
- Charlotte Davis Mooers (1924–2005), American computer scientist
- Charlotte Furth (1934–2022), née Davis, American scholar
