= Calvin Mooers =

American computer scientist

Calvin Northrup Mooers
- Born: October 24, 1919; Minneapolis, Minnesota
- Died: December 1, 1994 (aged 75); Cambridge, Massachusetts
- Occupation: Computer Scientist
- Spouse: Charlotte Davis

Calvin Northrup Mooers (October 24, 1919 – December 1, 1994), was an American computer scientist known for his work in information retrieval and for the programming language TRAC.

== Early life ==
Mooers was a native of Minneapolis, Minnesota, attended the University of Minnesota, and received a bachelor's degree in mathematics in 1941. He worked at the Naval Ordnance Laboratory from 1941 to 1946, and then attended the Massachusetts Institute of Technology, where he earned a master's degree in mathematics and physics. At M.I.T. he developed a mechanical system using superimposed codes of descriptors for information retrieval called Zatocoding. He founded the Zator Company in 1947 to market this idea, and pursued work in information theory, information retrieval, and artificial intelligence.

He coined the term "information retrieval", using it first in a conference paper presented in March 1950. See also a short paper published later that year from Mooers.

== Mooers's law ==
He coined "Mooers's law" (not to be confused with Moore's law) and its corollary in 1959:

An information retrieval system will tend not to be used whenever it is more painful and troublesome for a customer to have information than for him not to have it.

Where an information retrieval system tends not to be used, a more capable information retrieval system may tend to be used even less.

== TRAC ==
He founded the Rockford Research Institute in 1961, where he developed the TRAC programming language, and attempted to control its distribution and development using trademark law and a unique invocation of copyright. (At the time patent law would not allow him to control what he saw as his intellectual property and profit from it.) The trademark strategy was later used by Ada. It can be said that strategy was too successful because it was not able to be distributed to the extent that it's innovations justified. But ultimately many of those innovations were incorporated into other programming languages including those currently prevalent.

== Awards ==
Mooers received the American Society for Information Science's Award of Merit in 1978. The citation reads in part:

He was a participant in early developmental work on digital computers, a researcher, author, and implementer of applications in information retrieval; and a prophet in the 1950s describing the future importance of what is now called computer networks and distributive processing, and daring to predict that machines could simulate thought processes in retrieving computerized information. In 1947, he proposed the Zator, an electronic, film-scanning retrieval machine, and made the first proposal to use the Boolean operations or, and, and not to prescribe selections in retrieval machines. He developed his own Zatocoding System in 1948 using superimposed subject codes on edge-notched cards. He coined the term "Information Retrieval" in 1950, and went on from there to obtain several patents in information retrieval and signaling, produce a text-handling language (TRAC), author some 200 publications, and form one of the first companies whose only concern was information. His thinking has affected all who are in the field of Information and his early ideas are now incorporated into today's reality.

== Death ==
Mooers died in 1994 in Cambridge, Massachusetts. Mooers's article critical of John Vincent Atanasoff and his brief tenure as chief of a failed computer construction project at the Naval Ordnance Laboratory during World War II, was published posthumously in the May–June 2001 issue of IEEE Annals of the History of Computing.
