= Marguerite S. Chang =

American chemist

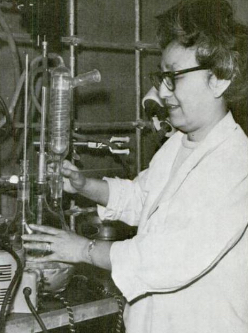
- Marguerite S. Chang, from a 1973 publication of the United States Department of the Navy
- Born: Shue-wen Yeh; June 21, 1923; Nanjing
- Died: May 5, 2012 (aged 88); Palo Alto, California
- Other names: Zhang Ye Xuewen
- Occupations: chemist, inventor
- Known for: Work at the Naval Ordnance Laboratory on propellants
- Awards: Federal Woman's Award (1973)

Marguerite Shue-wen Chang (張葉學文; June 21, 1923 – May 5, 2012) was a Chinese-born American research chemist and inventor, awarded the Federal Woman's Award in 1973 for her work in the United States Naval Ordnance Laboratory, based in Maryland.

== Personal life ==
=== Early life ===
Marguerite Shue-wen Ye was born in Nanjing in 1923. She earned a bachelor's degree in chemistry at Wuhan University. She earned a master's degree and a Ph.D. in organic chemistry at Tulane University, where she was an associate member of the Sigma Xi honor society. Her dissertation advisor was Joseph H. Boyer.

=== Adulthood ===
Marguerite S. Chang was married to George K. Chang. The couple moved to the United States together in 1946, and had two sons while Marguerite Chang was a graduate student at Tulane University. The Changs decided to stay in the United States after 1949. Marguerite S. Chang died in 2012, aged 88 years, in Palo Alto, California.

== Career ==
Chang moved to the United States in 1946. From 1959 she worked at the United States Naval Ordnance Laboratory in Maryland, developing propellants for missiles and rockets, working on safety procedures for the manufacture and use of propellants. She was named as an inventor on several patents, assigned to the United States government between 1976 and 1986, for processes, production methods and chemical compositions.

Chang's scientific publications included "The Identification of C_{32}H_{20}N_{4}O_{8}, a Product from Acetophenone and Nitric Acid" (Journal of the American Chemical Society 1960, with Joseph H. Boyer), and "Bis(cyclopropanecarbonyl)furoxan" (Journal of Organic Chemistry 1968, with James U. Lowe Jr.).

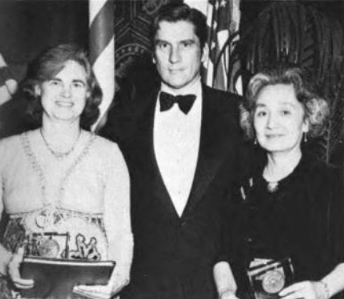
Isabella Karle, John Warner (Secretary of the Navy), and Marguerite S. Chang, from a 1973 annual report of the U.S. Naval Research Laboratory.

Chang is included in Conversations 760-009 and 871-009 of the White House Tapes, in the Oval Office for a photo sessions with President Richard Nixon and others in August 1972 and March 1973. She was one of the six women to receive the Federal Woman's Award in 1973.
