= SAM-N-8 Zeus =

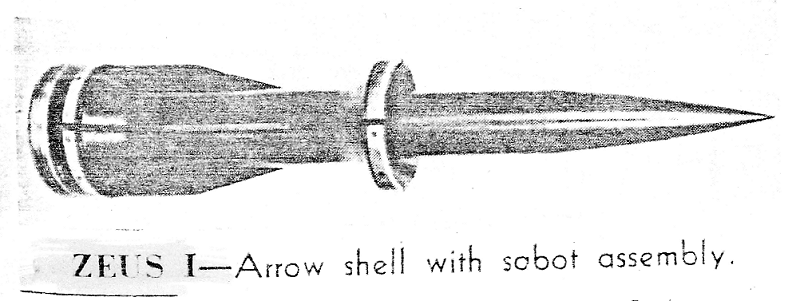
- Zeus I
- Type: Guided anti-aircraft artillery shell
- Place of origin: United States

Service history
- Used by: United States Navy

Production history
- Manufacturer: Naval Ordnance Laboratory

Specifications (XSAM-N-8 Zeus I)
- Mass: 72 lb (33 kg)
- Diameter: 4 in (100 mm)
- Warhead: High explosive
- Detonation mechanism: proximity fuse
- Engine: Course-correction solid-propellant rocket
- Operational range: 15,000 yd (14,000 m) effective
- Maximum speed: 3,150 ft/s (960 m/s) muzzle velocity
- Guidance system: Radio command guidance
- References: Parsch 2003

SAM-N-8 Zeus, also known as Zeus I, was a project by the Naval Ordnance Laboratory of the United States Navy to develop a guided anti-aircraft artillery shell for launch from 8-inch (200 mm) guns. Tested in the late 1940s, it was overtaken by advances in guided missile technology.

== Design and development ==
Development of the Gun Launched Guided Projectile - Arrow Shell was initiated by the U.S. Navy's Naval ordnance Laboratory (NOL) in June 1947, with the intent of developing a guided subcaliber projectile capable of being fired from the Mark 16 8"/55 caliber (203mm) guns mounted in the Des Moines-class heavy cruisers. In 1948, the project was officially classed as a guided missile, the designation XSAM-N-8 and name Zeus I being applied to the project.

Zeus consisted of a 4-inch (100 mm) shell, weighing 72 pounds (33 kg), launched using a sabot in the 8-inch gun; the shell was fitted with stabilizing fins and a small course-correction rocket; the guidance system involved a radio command being sent to trigger the deflection charge. Muzzle velocity was expected to be in the vicinity of 3,150 feet per second (960 m/s) with the use of standard powder charges in the Mark 16 gun, and a single-shot probability of kill (SSPK) of 0.3 at 5,000 yards (4,600 m) was anticipated, with 0.025 SSPK, the value of a conventional 5-inch (130 mm) AA round at 5,000 yards, being achievable at 15,000 yards (14,000 m).

== Operational history ==
Test firings of the XSAM-N-8 begun in 1948; by early 1950, when the project was transferred from the Navy's missile development office to a purely gun-development project and the XSAM-N-8 designation cancelled, 115 test shells had been fired. An improved Zeus II variant, with full guidance and a sustainer rocket motor, was projected, and there were proposals to complete the unfinished battleship USS Kentucky as an anti-aircraft ship with quadruple turrets of 8" (203mm) guns firing Zeus. However ordinary guided missiles were proving increasingly satisfactory, and when the U.S. Navy's missile programs were rationalized later that year the Zeus project was cancelled.
