= Charlotte Davis Mooers =

American computer scientist

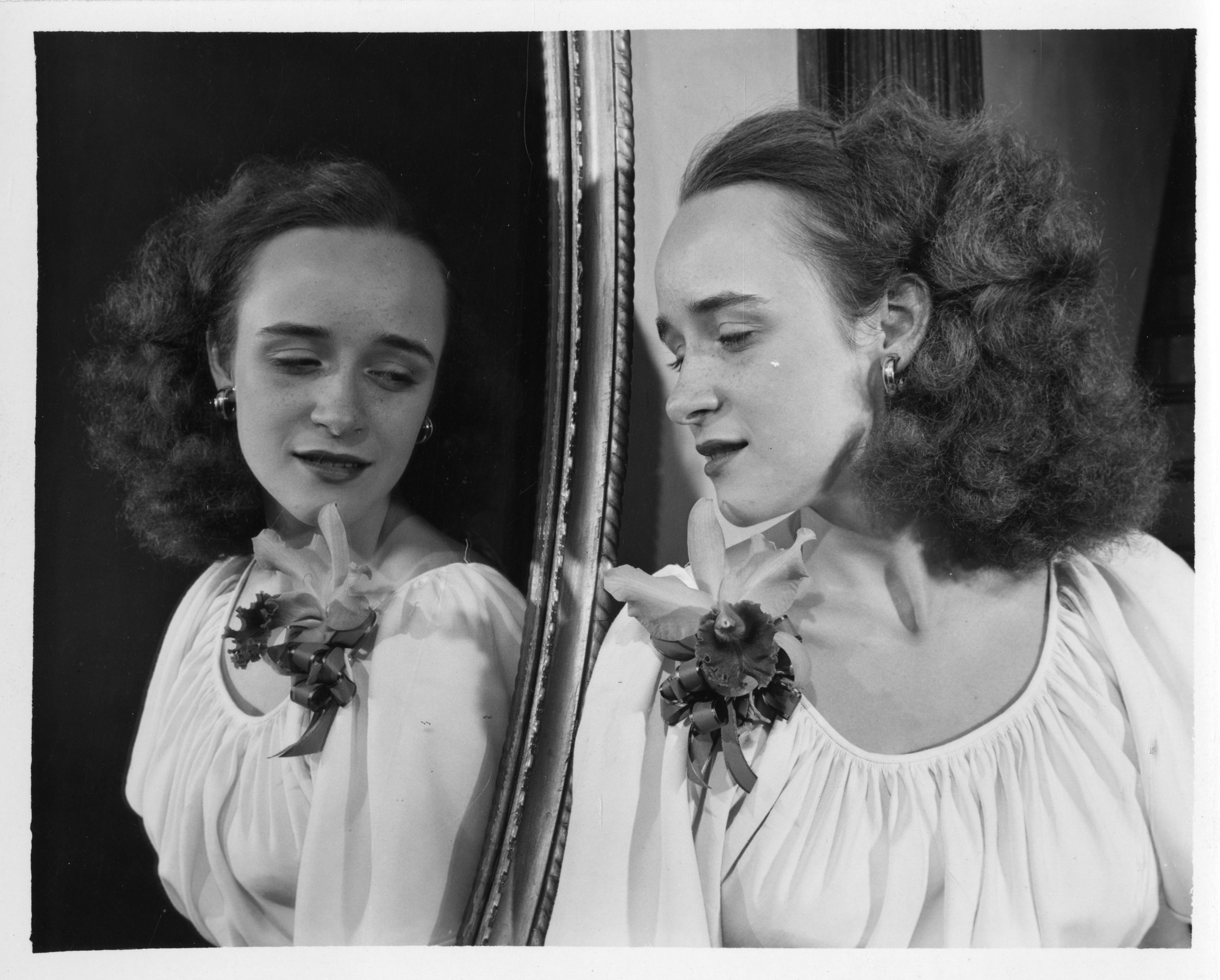
- Portrait by Fremont Davis.
- Born: Charlotte Davis; March 25, 1924; Washington, DC
- Died: March 17, 2005 (aged 80); Cambridge, Massachusetts
- Burial place: Hillside Cemetery, Hancock, NH
- Occupation: Computer scientist
- Spouse: Calvin Northrup Mooers
- Parents: Watson Davis (father); Helen Miles Davis (mother)

Charlotte Davis Mooers (25 March 1924 – 17 March 2005) was an American computer scientist whose research on programming languages began during World War II and continued through the early-1990s.

== Family ==
Born in Washington, DC on 25 March 1924, Charlotte was the daughter of Watson Davis, director of the Washington-based news organization Science Service, and Helen Miles Davis, editor of Chemistry magazine.

In a letter to her husband on 2 September 1945, Helen Davis wrote that Charlotte and Calvin Mooers were discussing marriage, and the two eventually wed.

== Career ==
During World War II, Davis worked for the Naval Ordnance Laboratory. In 1945, she was transferred to a facility in Newport, Rhode Island, but returned to the facility near Washington by early September that year. She was part of the Acoustic Division and, at one point, was under the supervision of John Bardeen, inventor of the transistor.

In 1947, she and her husband Calvin Mooers coauthored an electronics book for the general public, Electronics: What Everyone Should Know. In 1949, the two invented a card selecting device for use with the punched cards that were used for information retrieval using zatocoding; they were granted a patent in 1954.

In the 1970s and 1980s, she worked on the HERMES Message System at Bolt, Beranek and Newman, Inc.

== External list ==
Oral history interview with Calvin N. Mooers and Charlotte D. Mooers
