= Naval Ordnance Laboratory =

Disestablished United States naval laboratory at White Oak, Maryland

Coordinates: 39°2′16″N 76°58′47″W

The Naval Ordnance Laboratory (NOL) was a facility in the White Oak area of Montgomery County, Maryland. The location is now used as the headquarters of the U.S. Food and Drug Administration.

== Origins ==
The U.S. Navy Mine Unit, later the Mine Laboratory at the Washington Navy Yard, was established in 1918, and the first Officer in Charge (OIC) arrived in February 1919, marking the beginning of the Laboratory. In 1929 the Mine Laboratory was merged with the Experimental Ammunition Station in Indian Head to form the Naval Ordnance Laboratory.

NOL began slowly, and it was not until the beginnings of World War II, when Germany's aircraft-laid magnetic mine began to cause serious problems for the Allies. As the importance of NOL's work became apparent, it also became apparent that there wasn't enough space at the Navy Yard to accommodate the necessary research facilities.

In 1944, acquisition, planning and construction work began at a 712-acre (2.88 km^{2}) wooded site located at 10903 New Hampshire Avenue, Silver Spring, Maryland. Someone remarked to a Navy official during early 1945 that it seemed odd to be building the new laboratory at that time: the war would probably be over before the facility could be finished. "That laboratory" remarked the Navy man, "is not being built for this war".

== Layout ==
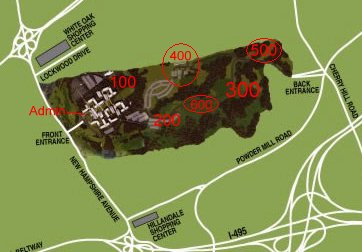
Map of FDA with NOL areas overlaid

Map Reference	Type of Operation
Admin	Administration & Offices
100 Area	Machine Shops and Laboratories
200 Area	Magnetic Research Facilities
300 Area	Explosives Research and Testing
400 Area	Wind Tunnel Research Underwater Weapons Testing
500 Area	Radioactive Dosimeter Testing
600 Area	Energetic Material Research and Development; Mid-1960s – 1997

=== Administration area ===
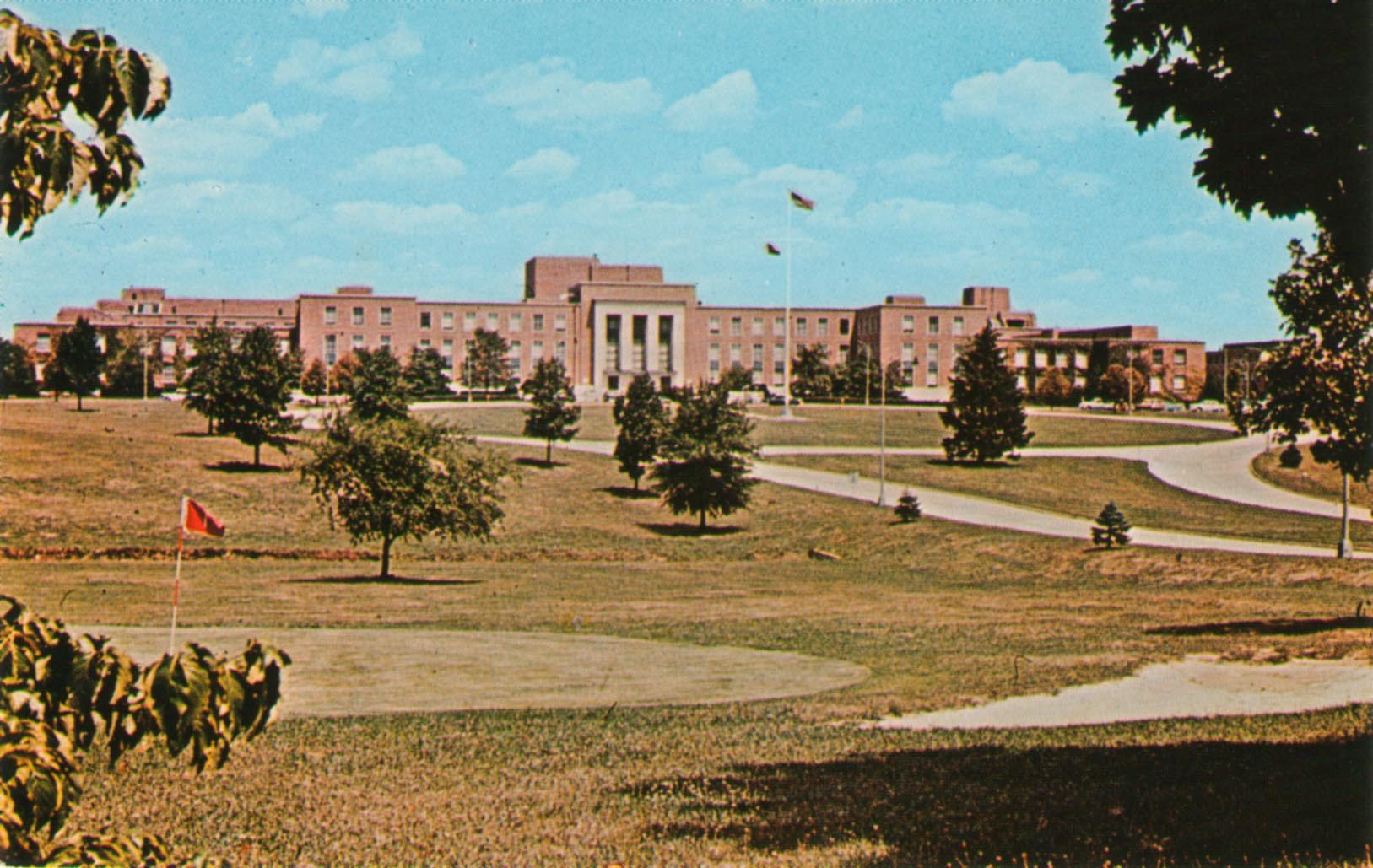
1960s-era postcard

This 1960s-era postcard image shows the NOL Administration Building and an employee-built golf course as seen from New Hampshire Ave. After renovation for use by the FDA it still looks much the same, with "Naval Ordnance Laboratory" still carved in stone above the main entrance.

Building 1 through 4 were arranged in a quadrangle nearest the New Hampshire Avenue entrance. These buildings held administrative offices and project offices. Building 5 intersected with 1 and 4, and held convenience stores, including a barber shop and the credit union. It terminated in a large cafeteria. White Oak was still farmland in the 1940s.

=== The 100 Area ===
A total of 11 buildings, connected by wide underground tunnels consisting of Administration and the main laboratory complex, which included corrosion and battery research among many other specialties.

The Phoenix/Casino building in the 100 Area was quite unique – in this building, systems and components were subjected to nuclear weapons radiation simulation. "Phoenix" undoubtedly refers to systems "rising from the ashes" after a nuclear explosion. The "Casino" moniker was apparently a reference to the "luck of the draw" on receiving funding for this facility. It was hoped that another military agency would take over the Casino facility after the base closure, but it is believed to have been abandoned.

=== The 200 Area ===
The first technical facilities were in the new magnetic area (the 200 area). This area was in the middle of the woods, and remained so up until the Lab's demise in 1994. It is believed that the area was selected because it was magnetically neutral – there was less iron in the earth than in other areas to interfere with sensitive magnetic experiments. The buildings were made of wood, with wooden pegs instead of nails. The buildings had unusual names: Bldg 203 was the "Spherical Field Lab", Building 204 was the "Long Field Lab".

=== The 300 Area ===
The largest area geographically, the 300 area, was the explosives research area. This area included 50 or more buildings in which a wide range of explosives activities were performed, ranging from basic compound research and new formulations, to large scale weapon systems design. Some building were large manufacturing facilities while others were very small (< 100 sq ft) housing a single scientist and his or her lab and office space.

The largest test facility was Building 327, the 50-Pound Bombproof Facility , which became operational in 1984. The center of the building housed a 20' x 20' x 16' steel-lined reinforced concrete test chamber capable of containing an explosion equivalent to 50 pounds of TNT. Numerous sophisticated high-speed cameras, x-ray equipment, and high-speed electronics were used to monitor a wide range of experiments. A four-inch (102 mm) single-stage light-gas gun and one-inch two-stage light-gas gun set up to fire projectiles into the chamber further extended the facility's capabilities.

=== The 400 Area ===
The 400 area was home to a number of wind tunnels. At the end of World War II, the G.I.'s found several large wind tunnels in Peenemünde, Germany. The wind tunnels were disassembled and brought back to the United States. One went to NOL's sister laboratory, the David Taylor Model Basin (DTMB), in Carderock, Maryland. DTMB operated that wind tunnel until the 1990s, when a major failure led to its abandonment.

White Oak's "Supersonic Wind Tunnel," the larger of the German wind tunnels, was installed in 1947. There was a number of similar facilities including the Mach 10 Wind Tunnel (1950), Mach 12 Wind Tunnel (1951), the Hypersonic Wind Tunnel (1957), and the Hypervelocity Wind Tunnel (1972) (Article about work performed at the Hypervelocity Wind Tunnel Hypervelocity wind tunnel reaches 3,000-run milestone ).

The U.S. Air Force's Arnold Engineering Development Center (AEDC) currently (in 2010) operates the Hypervelocity Wind Tunnel 9. This facility, known simply as Tunnel 9, operates by blowing down hot, high-pressure nitrogen gas through one of several available axially-symmetric 12-meter-long De Laval nozzles, through a test section, and into a downstream vacuum sphere. Operating in the test-section Mach number range of 7 to 16, Tunnel 9 is the highest-pressure wind tunnel in the world. It produces realistic flight Reynolds numbers at hypersonic Mach numbers and beyond, with test times on the order of one second.

Other buildings in the Aeroballistics Area 400, including the original main wind tunnel building (415) and the 1,000-foot (300 m) Hyperballistics Range, are now (in 2010) abandoned and have fallen into disrepair. They are to be demolished during the continuing GSA conversion of the old NOL campus into the Federal Research Center at White Oak. A section of the original Peenemünde wind tunnel (Tunnel 1) is preserved in the lobby of the Tunnel 9 building.

=== The 500 Area ===
There were a number of unique facilities in this area. The "Positive Ion Accelerator Facility" was one facility located there, and transferred to the Naval Surface Warfare Center Carderock Division aka David Taylor Model Basin, under the power systems branch of the functional materials division. It now has the name of "Tandem Pelletron Positive – Ion Accelerator Facility".

=== The 600 Area ===
The 600 area was the first group of buildings east of Paint Branch. This group of approximately 25 buildings and support structures consisted of three clusters located along Kuester Road. Notable facilities include 611/618 (Shock Testing Facility, 1963/Shock Simulator, 1960), which housed a 90-foot long, 26-inch bore air gun designed at NOL in 1958 for testing full-size weapons.

== Later history ==
NOL was purposely built in what was then a remote area. White Oak was still farmland, and the designers could not have predicted the phenomenal growth of the Maryland suburbs of Washington, DC. But the relentless spread of civilization brought homes and townhouses right up to the fence surrounding the Lab. Purchasers of houses next to an "Ordnance Laboratory" expected to hear an occasional explosion, and were occasionally rewarded with one.

In 1974, the lab was merged with Naval Weapons Laboratory in Dahlgren, Virginia, to form the Naval Surface Weapons Center, later renamed the Naval Surface Warfare Center. As years passed after the name change, fewer local residents understood the nature of the research being conducted on areas of the base. Explosives testing operations were carried on in hardened indoor test facilities and almost no external signs of explosions and other tests being carried out reached the edge of the facility.

This all changed suddenly on a Sunday afternoon, 28 June 1992, at about 1 pm when the contents of explosives storage magazine Building 355 exploded. Approximately 5,000 lb (2,300 kg) of stored explosives detonated, shattering windows and rattling china in the nearby neighborhoods. While the magazine accomplished its design purpose of limiting off-site damage (it was designed to hold up to 7,000 lb (3,200 kg) safely), this did not endear the Laboratory to the neighbors, and probably contributed to the ultimate decision to close the Lab.

A Wall Street Journal investigative project in 2013, "Waste Lands: America's Forgotten Nuclear Legacy," is deserving of attention. See

http://projects.wsj.com/waste-lands/state/MD/

Among listed sites in Maryland was the campus of the former Navy Ordnance Laboratory which was listed by the US Navy as a hazardous waste site which may have harbored radioactive materials related to nuclear weapons development. Its current status is listed as follows: "Referred to another agency or program, no authority to clean up under FUSRAP, or status unclear.... The Department of Energy initially considered cleaning up this site under the Formerly Utilized Sites Remedial Action Program, but determined that it didn't have the authority to do so... Research and development - may have involved radioactive materials because the site was identified on a 1955 Accountability Station List."

A 2011 NIOSH evaluation states " *National Institute for Occupational Safety and Health. Source: Report on Residual Radioactive and Beryllium Contamination at Atomic Weapons Employer Facilities and Beryllium Vendor Facilities (Aug. 2011), Appendix A-2. The National Institute for Occupational Safety and Health, as part of a federal program to compensate individuals for health damage from work in the atomics-weapons industry, analyzes information about scores of sites around the country. It looks for evidence that a site engaged in activities that might have exposed workers to harmful amounts of weapons-related radiation. If such a situation is found, the agency looks for evidence that the site was either satisfactorily cleaned up or that the risk of significant residual contamination was low. If NIOSH can't find evidence of either, it lists the site as having a potential for such contamination. However, agency officials say, this designation doesn't mean a health threat exists. It merely means that based on available evidence NIOSH can't rule out such a threat." A WSJ note adds, " A Navy spokesman said the site did handle radioactive material and did require a clean-up."

http://projects.wsj.com/waste-lands/site/311-naval-ordnance-laboratory/

=== Base Realignment and Closure ===
The Base Realignment and Closure (BRAC) report of 1991 reduced the scope of NOL and reduced the staff to 650 persons. BRAC '93 recommended dis-establishment, and the move of the Naval Sea Systems Command (NAVSEA) from leased buildings in Crystal City, Virginia to White Oak.

The NOL was partitioned between three existing Naval Surface Warfare Center (NSWC) R&D Labs: NSWC Dahlgren retained the weapons systems research and associated personnel. NSWC Indian Head received the explosives research, and NSWC Carderock, formerly David Taylor Model Basin, received the basic research interests.

Ultimately, the NAVSEA had the choice of relocation sites. White Oak boasted a nine-hole golf course, hundreds of acres of woods with abundant flora and fauna, and a pleasant suburban location with existing buildings, ample parking, good roads, shopping and housing. Although the Washington Navy Yard, in a decaying part of the city, had few such benefits to recommend it, it was the choice of the NAVSEA.

== Food and Drug Administration ==
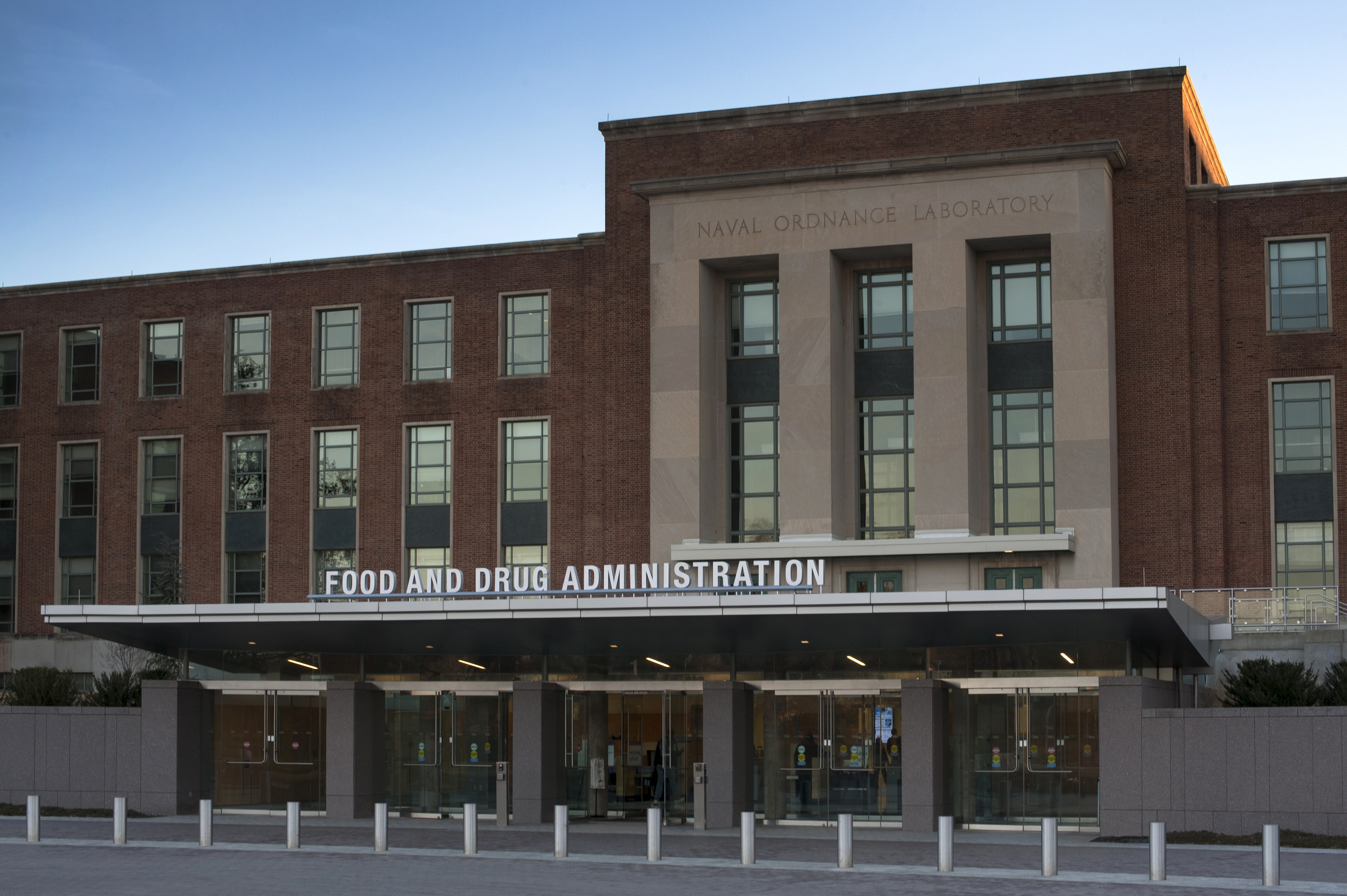
A campus building rebuilt as Food and Drug Administration headquarters

In 1995, the NSWC was closed and the site was transferred to the General Services Administration (GSA). In 1996, the site was renamed the Federal Research Center (FRC) at White Oak. 130 acres (53 ha) of the western portion of the FRC was designated for consolidation of the regionally dispersed facilities of the FDA into a secured campus headquarters with laboratories, offices, support facilities, and amenities. The main entrance of the FDA campus, at 10903 New Hampshire Avenue, retained the setting of the previous use with a large open space (a portion of the golf course, which had closed), a linear drive, and the renovation and integration of the original NOL Administration Building into the new FDA headquarters. In 2014, it was anticipated that, upon completion of the facility, nearly 9,000 employees would be working in nearly 6,000,000 square feet (56 ha).

Minutes of the meetings of the Naval Surface Warfare Center-White Oak Restoration Advisory Board document the extensive environmental contamination of the site prior to transfer to GSA. The Naval Facilities Engineering Command, Maryland Department of the Environment, the US Environmental Protection Agency and the National Institute for Occupational Safety and Health collaborated over more than ten years of clean-up involving hazardous chemicals, radioactive waste and explosives.

== Historic designations ==
In 1997, the Maryland Historical Trust (the Maryland State Historic Preservation Office) determined that the 732 acres (296 ha) NOL/NSWC was eligible for inclusion on the National Register of Historic Places and the Maryland Historic Sites Inventory. The Montgomery County Historic Preservation Commission has evaluated a 10.5 acres (4.2 ha) portion of the former NOL that contains the NOL's Administration Building, a flagpole and an open space along the building's access road from New Hampshire Avenue. The Commission recommended that the 10.5 acres portion be designated as a historic site in the County's Master Plan for Historic Preservation. The property was listed on the National Register in 2025.

The Montgomery County Planning Board then also recommended that the 10.5 acres site be designated in the County's Master Plan for Historic Preservation. The historic site was designated on the County's Master Plan for Historic Preservation in July 2014.

== Projects ==
- A World War II artillery fuse.
- Bismanol- an iron-manganese alloy (a portmanteau of Bismuth + manganese + NOL- the initials of the Naval Ordnance Laboratory).
- Nitinol, a shape-changing nickel-titanium alloy (a portmanteau of nickel + titanium + NOL- the initials of the Naval Ordnance Laboratory).
- Hypervelocity wind tunnel testing of Space Shuttle models for NASA.
- Terfenol-D, a magnetostrictive alloy.
- Zeus, a guided anti-aircraft artillery shell.

== People ==
People who have worked there include:

- Martin B. Kraichman, Physicist wrote Handbook of Electromagnetic Propagation in Conducting Media.
- John Vincent Atanasoff, inventor of the first electronic computer, Chief of the NOL Acoustics Division.
- John Bardeen, the only person to win two Nobel Prizes in Physics.
- William J. Buehler. shape memory alloy.
- William E. Caswell, physicist and victim of 11 September 2001.
- Marguerite S. Chang (1923-2012), organic chemist and inventor, worked on propellants
- Sigmund J. Jacobs, inventor of theory for the equation of state of detonation products, the Jacobs-Cowperthwaite-Zwisler(JCZ) equation. Also, was a life fellow of SMPTE for his work in high speed photo imagery. obituary Wikipedia entry describing some of his work on Kamlet-Jacobs equations.
- Phyllis S. Freier (1944-1945), astrophysicist. As a graduate student she presented evidence for the existence of elements heavier than helium in cosmic radiation. Her work was published in Physical Review in 1948 with co-authors Edward J. Lofgren, Edward P. Ney, and Frank Oppenheimer.
- Calvin Mooers, pioneer in information retrieval and inventor of the TRAC language, worked on anti-mine measures at NOL and was designer of the NOL computer project.
- Charlotte Davis Mooers, computer scientist.
- Samuel J. Raff, nuclear physicist, electrical engineer, founding editor of the scientific journal Computers and Operations Research.
- I. Lee Reed (1917–1966) worked at the Washington Naval Gun Factory during and after World War II (with a brief transfer to the Navy's China Lake facility at Inyokern, California in 1946), and moved to NOL in 1951–52, where he was employed for the rest of his life. During the war he worked on the proximity fuse and artillery shells. At NOL he continued this work and was involved with other weapons systems, including the Polaris missile. His work occasionally took him to the testing facilities at White Sands, New Mexico and to China Lake.
- Norm Scofield, inventor of the Scofield-Gold neutron unfolding algorithm which is a method of solving a Fredholm integral equation.
- Daniel Shanks, mathematician who developed the Shanks transformation while working at NOL.
- Kathryn Grove Shipp (1904-1977), explosives expert, contributed to Apollo program
- Henry Earl Singleton, electrical engineer, cofounder of Teledyne, Inc.
- Robert J. Urick, Senior Research Physicist, author of Principles of Underwater Sound.*
- Jack W. Wise (1917–2005), worked for the White Oak Laboratory (see alumni site for the WOL below) during World War II, and for NOL from the 1940s on into the late 1960s. During the war, he worked on fuse ruggedization, ship demagnetization. Later, he worked on the Polaris Missile project, the Sonabouy project, and laser optics research for the Navy. Other details uncertain. Would entertain further edits with accurate information.

== Alumni association ==
The White Oak Laboratory Alumni Association (WOLAA) was formed as a not-for-profit alumni organization for the purpose of:

- Carrying out programs to perpetuate the history, memory and accomplishments of the WOL for the United States Navy and the United States of America
- Sponsoring and participating in activities of a patriotic nature
- Perpetuating the camaraderie and memories of former WOL employees and the people who worked on site to support the WOL and its employees

== See also ==
- Naval Ordnance Laboratory Test Facility

== Notes ==
The description of the facilities was gleaned from "On the Surface", Volume 17, Number 10, 30 September 1994, a publication of the Dahlgren Division, Naval Surface Warfare Center. This issue was titled "THE WHITE OAK LABORATORY: A Tribute".
