= Mooers's law =

Comment about usage of information retrieval

Mooers's law is a comment about the use of information retrieval systems made by the American computer scientist Calvin Mooers in 1959:

An information retrieval system will tend not to be used whenever it is more painful and troublesome for a customer to have information than for him not to have it.

— Calvin Mooers

== Original interpretation ==
Mooers argued that information is at risk of languishing unused due not only on the effort required to assimilate it but also to any implications of the information that may conflict with the user's prior information. In learning new information, a user may end up proving their work incorrect or irrelevant. Mooers argued that users prefer to remain in a state of safety in which new information is ignored in an attempt to save potential embarrassment or reprisal from supervisors.

== Out-of-context interpretation ==
The more common interpretation of Mooers's law is similar to Zipf's principle of least effort. It emphasizes the amount of effort needed to use and understand an information retrieval system before the information seeker gives up; it is often paraphrased to increase the focus on the retrieval system:

The more difficult and time consuming it is for a customer to use an information system, the less likely it is that he will use that information system.

— J. Michael Pemberton

Mooers's Law tells us that information will be used in direct proportion to how easy it is to obtain.

— Roger K. Summit

In this interpretation, "painful and troublesome" comes from using the retrieval system.

== See also ==
- Availability heuristic
- Cognitive dissonance
- Confirmation bias
- Satisficing

== Bibliography ==
- Austin, Brice (June 2001). "Mooers' Law: In and out of Context". Journal of the American Society for Information Science and Technology. 25 (8): 607–609. doi:10.1002/asi.1114.
