= Bismanol =

Identifiers
CAS Number	12010-50-3
3D model (JSmol)	Interactive image
ChemSpider	20137871
EC Number	234-556-2
PubChem CID	6336867
CompTox Dashboard (EPA)	DTXSID8065161
- InChI: InChI=1S/Bi.Mn Key: KYAZRUPZRJALEP-UHFFFAOYSA-N
- SMILES: [Mn].[Bi]

Properties
Chemical formula	BiMn
Molar mass	263.91844 g·mol^{−1}

Structure
Crystal structure	NiAs type
Space group	R3̅m

Properties
Melting point	262 °C Decomposes at ~335 °C (peritectic formation of MnBi)
- Except where otherwise noted, data are given for materials in their standard state (at 25 °C [77 °F], 100 kPa). Infobox references

Bismanol is a magnetic alloy of bismuth and manganese (manganese bismuthide) developed by the US Naval Ordnance Laboratory.

== History ==
Bismanol, a permanent magnet made from powder metallurgy of manganese bismuthide, was developed by the US Naval Ordnance Laboratory in the early 1950s – at the time of invention it was one of the highest coercive force permanent magnets available, at 3000 oersteds. Coercive force reached 3650 oersteds and magnetic flux density 4800 by the mid 1950s. The material was generally strong, and stable to shock and vibration, but had a tendency to chip. Slow corrosion of the material occurred under normal conditions.

The material was used to make permanent magnets for use in small electric motors.

Bismanol magnets have been replaced by neodymium magnets which are both cheaper and superior in other ways, by samarium-cobalt magnets in more critical applications, and by alnico magnets.
