= Aperture card =

Punch card in which a piece of microfilm is mounted

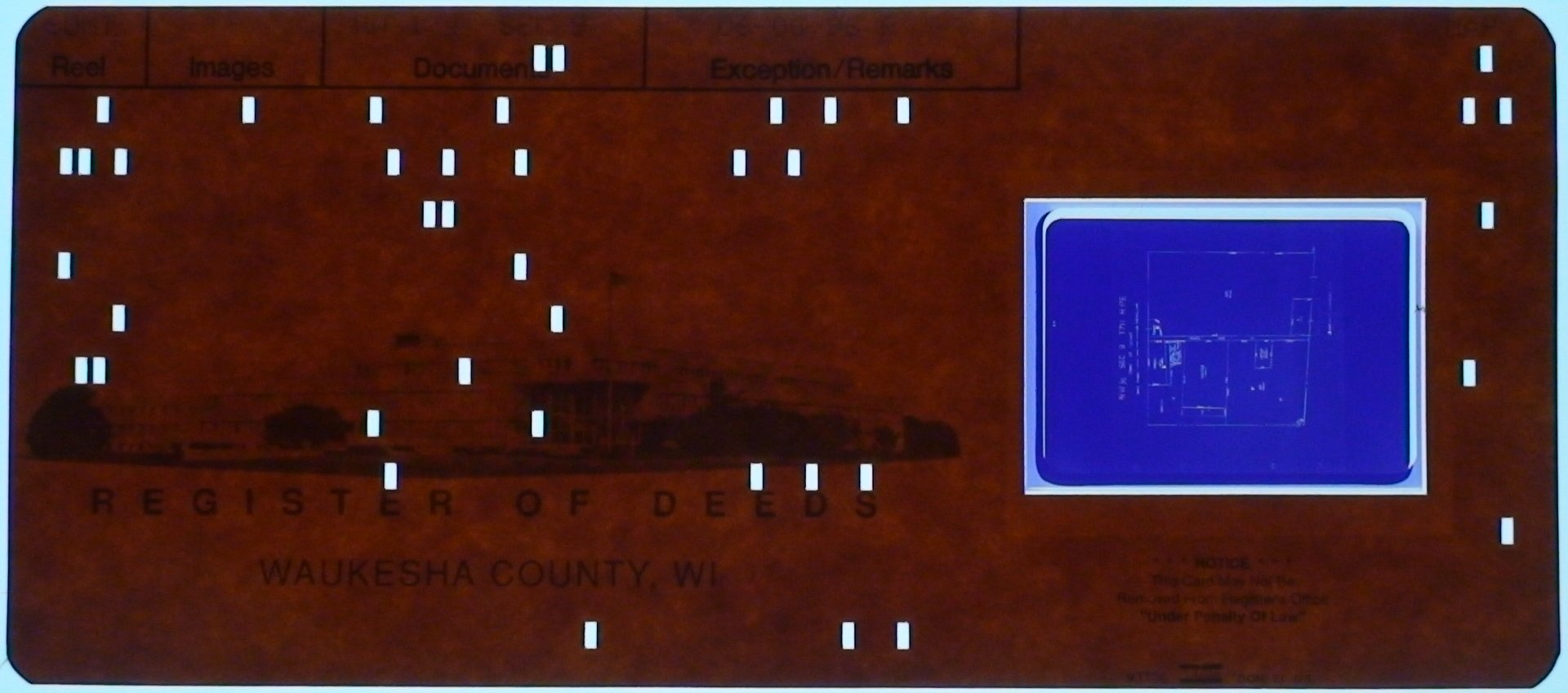
A backlit aperture card showing hollerith holes and the microform image, with the label "Register of deeds. Waukesha County, Wisconsin"

An aperture card is a punched card with a cut-out window into which a chip of microfilm is mounted. The card is typically punched with machine-readable metadata associated with the microfilm image, and printed across the top of the card for visual identification.

Aperture cards are used for archiving, for making multiple inexpensive copies of a document for ease of distribution, and for engineering drawings.

Machinery exists to automatically store, retrieve, sort, duplicate, create, and digitize cards with a high level of automation. Aperture cards can be converted to digital documents using scanning equipment and software.

== Description ==
An aperture card is a type of punched card with a cut-out window into which a chip of microfilm is mounted. The card is typically punched with machine-readable metadata associated with the microfilm image, and printed across the top of the card for visual identification; it may also be punched by hand in the form of an edge-notched card. Information about the drawing, for example the drawing number, could be both punched and printed on the remainder of the card. With the proper machinery, this allows for automated handling. In the absence of such machinery, the cards can still be read by a human with a lens and a light source.

The microfilm chip is most commonly 35 mm in height, and contains an optically reduced image, usually of some type of reference document, such as an engineering drawing, that is the focus of the archiving process.

== Usage ==
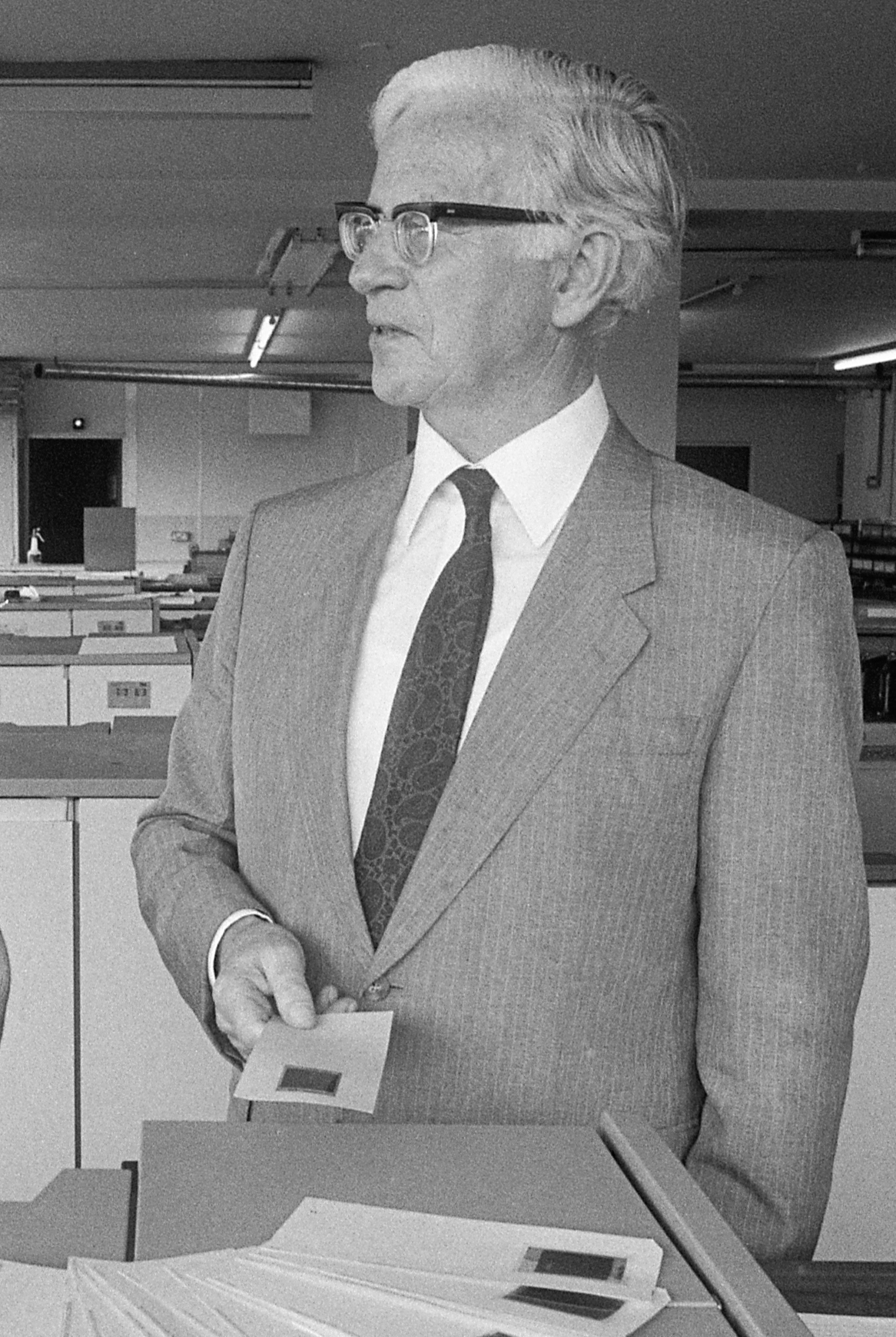
Ronald Kay, chief executive of UCCA, is seen holding an aperture card. The cards held a microfilm image of a candidate's applications to UK universities, and were used to print batches of applications sorted by the university and course applied to.

Aperture cards are used for archiving or for making multiple inexpensive copies of a document for ease of distribution. They are used for engineering drawings from all engineering disciplines. The U.S. Department of Defense once made extensive use of aperture cards, and some are still in use, but most data is now digital.

=== Advantages ===
Aperture cards have, for archival purposes, some advantages over digital systems. They have a 500-year lifetime, they are human readable, and there is no expense or risk in converting from one digital format to the next when computer systems become obsolete.

=== Disadvantages ===
Aperture cards require a filing system, as well as experienced clerks and often sorting equipment. In order for records on aperture cards to be useful, they need to be archived correctly. Cards need to be archived either via a numbering scheme (in which each card is assigned a number and sorted according to the number) or a index system (in which cards are sorted by metadata). As with paper records, the indexing, locating, and refiling processes add significantly to the workload of record keepers. As is common with other forms of record keeping, misfiling cards after use (particularly in large archives) results in the card being lost. It may take significant time and effort from an archivist to locate a lost record.

The processing optical film is a chemical process as requires paper, equipment, etc. The very nature of microfilm cameras and the high contrast properties of microfilm stock itself also impose limits on the amount of detail that can be resolved particularly at the higher reduction ratios (i.e. +36:1) needed to film larger drawings on standard 35mm. In 1960, a US Air Force report suggested details to be stored on a 35mm/IBM aperture card should be no smaller than ^{1}/_{32} of an inch; be at least ^{1}/_{64} of an inch apart; and that reductions be made in ratios of either 16:1 or 29:1. Faded drawings or those of low or uneven contrast do not reproduce well and significant detail or annotations may be lost. The same reported noted an expected loss of at least 10% of detail in the best of cases, with an upper margin of 50% loss of detail for lower quality drawings or prints.

Aperture cards created from 35mm roll film mounted on to blank cards have to be treated with great care. Bending the card can cause the film to detach and excessive pressure to a stack of cards can cause the mounting glue to ooze creating clumps of cards which will feed through duplicators and other machinery either poorly or not at all. Feeding a de-laminated card through machinery not only risks destroying the image, but also risks jamming or damaging the machinery.

== Machinery ==
A set of cards could be rapidly sorted by drawing number or other punched data using a card sorter. Machines are now available that scan aperture cards and produce a digital version. (Note: For example, an aperture card scanner.) Aperture card plotters are machines that use a laser to create the image on the film. (Note: For example, an aperture card plotter.)

== Conversion ==
Aperture cards can be converted to digital documents using scanning equipment and software. Scanning can allow for significant image cleanup and enhancement. Often, the digital image produced is better than the visual quality available prescan.
