= Charlotte Kasl =

American psychologist (1938–2021)

Charlotte Sophia Kasl
- Born: Charlotte Davis; August 19, 1938; Missoula, Montana, U.S.
- Died: August 7, 2021 (aged 82); Missoula, Montana, U.S.
- Burial place: Missoula City Cemetery
- Other name: Charlotte Davis Kasl
- Education: The University of Michigan; Ohio University
- Occupations: Pianist, psychologist
- Spouse: Stanislav Kasl

Charlotte Sophia Kasl (née Davis; August 19, 1938 – August 7, 2021) was an American psychologist and author.

== Life and work ==
Born Charlotte Davis on August 19, 1938, in Missoula, Montana, her parents were Mary Shope and Kenneth Pickett Davis. From an early age she showed a talent for piano and at age 17 she was teaching four of her own students. At the University of Michigan she earned her BA in Music and MA in Piano. She pursued piano studies for many years before becoming disillusioned with "the prospects of a music career in a department steeped in patriarchy."

Now using her married name Charlotte Kasl, she began studying psychology and in 1982, received her PhD in Counseling at Ohio University, which allowed her to "merge her deep and profound interests in complex family dynamics and relationships with the cultural context of feminism and sexual politics."

She pioneered the 16-Steps for Discovery and Empowerment as an alternative to the Twelve-step program for recovery from addiction, compulsion, or other behavioral problems.

She wrote several books based on some aspects of Sufi, Quaker, and Buddhist spiritual beliefs and traditions.

Lifetime Achievement Award, the National Council on Sexual Addiction and Compulsivity, 1997.

Kasl died on August 7, 2021, at the age of 82.

== Selected works ==
- Women, Sex, and Addiction: A Search for Love and Power, 1990. ISBN 978-0-06-097321-6
- Many Roads, One Journey: Moving Beyond the 12 Steps, 1992. ISBN 978-0-06-096518-1
- Finding Joy: 101 Ways to free Your Spirit, 1994. ISBN 978-0-06-092588-8
- Yes, You Can!: A Guide to Empowerment Groups, 1995. ISBN 978-0-9644520-0-8
- A Home for the Heart: A Practical Guide to Intimate and Social relationships, 1998. ISBN 978-0-06-092919-0
- If the Buddha Dated: A Handbook for Finding Love on a Spiritual Path, 1999. ISBN 978-0-14-019583-5
- If the Buddha Married: Creating Enduring Relationships on a Spiritual Path, 2001. ISBN 978-0-14-019622-1
- If the Buddha Got Stuck: A Handbook for Change on a Spiritual Path, 2005. ISBN 978-0-14-219628-1
- Zen and the Art of a Happier Life, 2005. ISBN 978-0-553-81495-8
- If the Buddha Had Kids: Raising Children to Create a More Peaceful World, 2012. ISBN 978-0-14-311631-8

== See also ==
- Pagans in Recovery
