= Edge-notched card =

Index card with notches to store data

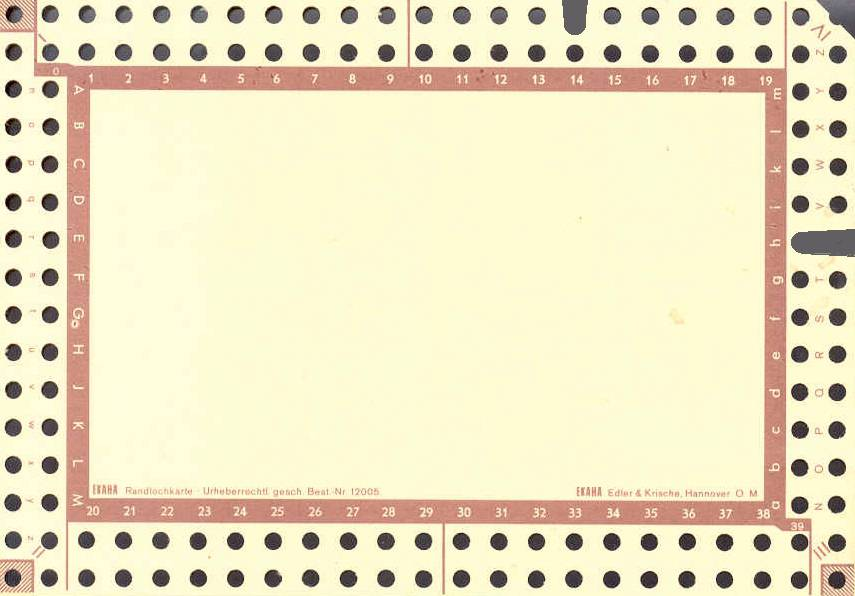
A notched card showing two levels of notching.

Edge-notched cards or edge-punched cards are a system used to store a small amount of binary or logical data on paper index cards, encoded via the presence or absence of notches in the edges of the cards. The notches allow efficient sorting of a large number of cards in a paper-based database, as well as the selection of specific cards matching multiple desired criteria.

Unlike machine-readable punched cards, edge-notched cards were designed to be manually sorted by human operators. They are also informally called needle cards since they can be sorted with the help of long knitting needles. In the mid-20th century they were sold under names such as Cope-Chat cards, E-Z Sort cards, McBee Keysort cards, and Indecks cards.

== History ==
An early instance of a methodology similar to edge-notched cards appeared in 1904. Edge-notched cards were used for specialized data storage and cataloging through much of the 20th century. They were gradually replaced by computer storage.

== Formats ==
Edge-notched card used as a library card. Edges not notched here.

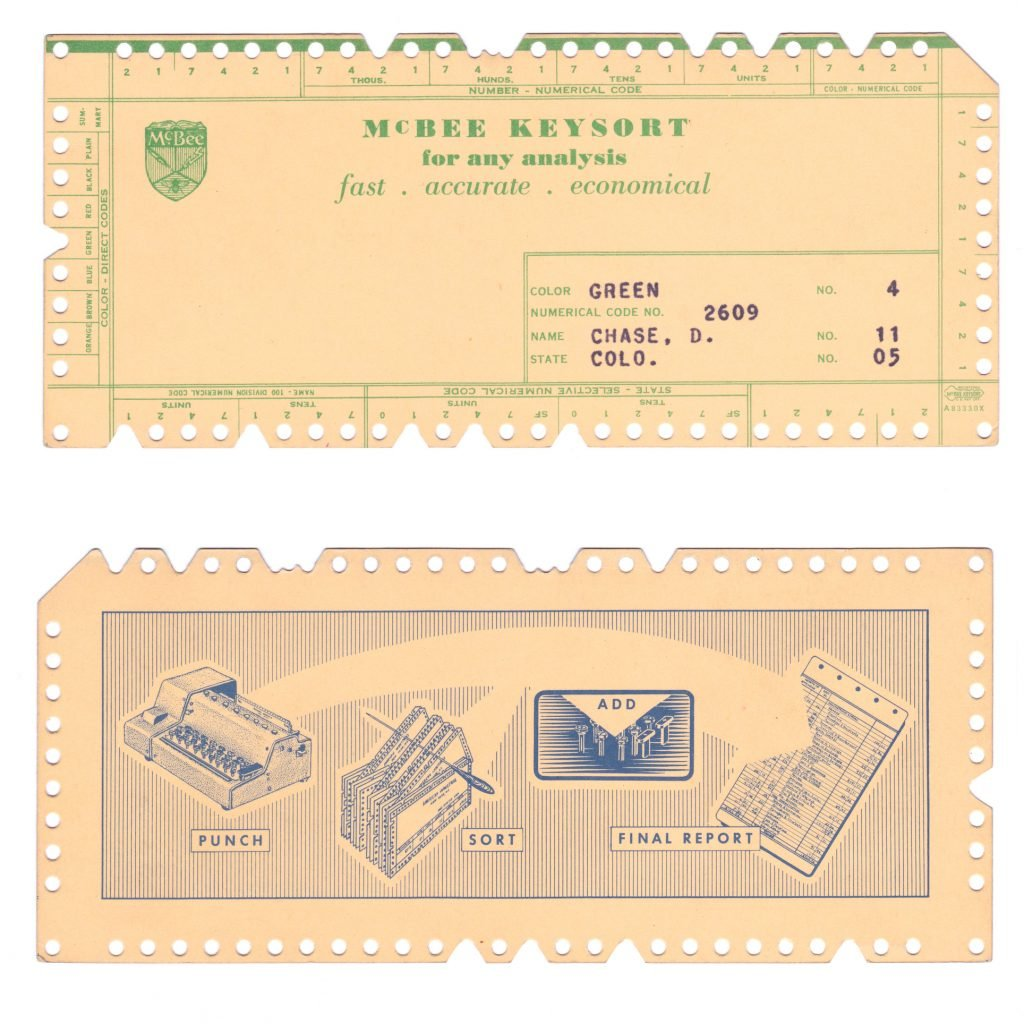
McBee Keysort card (1932 – 1980s): front and rear, with instructional diagram on rear

Cards existed in many variants, with differing sizes and numbers of rows of holes. The center of the card could be blank for information to be written onto, or contain a pre-printed form. In the case of edge-notched aperture cards, it would contain a microform image.

By the mid-20th century a popular version consisted of 5-by-8-inch (13 by 20 cm) paperboard cards with holes punched at regular intervals along all four edges, a short distance in from the edges.

== Encoding of data ==
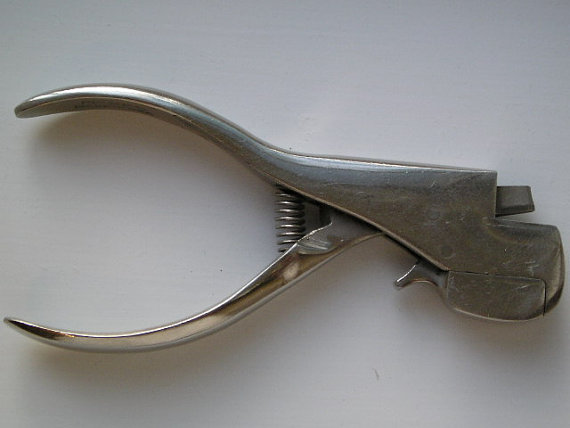
Hand tool for notching cards.

To record data, the paper stock between a hole and the nearest edge was removed by a special notching tool. The holes were assigned a meaning dependent upon a particular application. For example, one hole might record the answer to a yes/no question on a survey, with the presence of a notch meaning "yes". More complex data was encoded using a variety of schemes, often using a superimposed code which allowed more distinct categories to be coded than the number of holes available.

== Retrieval and sorting ==
To allow a visual check that all cards in a deck were oriented the same way, one corner of each card was beveled, much like Hollerith punched cards. Edge-notched cards, however, were not intended to be read by machines such as IBM card sorters.

Instead, cards were manipulated by passing one or more slim needles through selected holes in a group of cards. While the rest of the deck would be lifted by moving the needles, those cards that were notched in the hole positions where the needles were inserted would be left behind. Using two or more needles produced a logical and function. Combining the cards from two different selections produced a logical or. Quite complex manipulations, including sorting were possible using these techniques.

== Applications ==
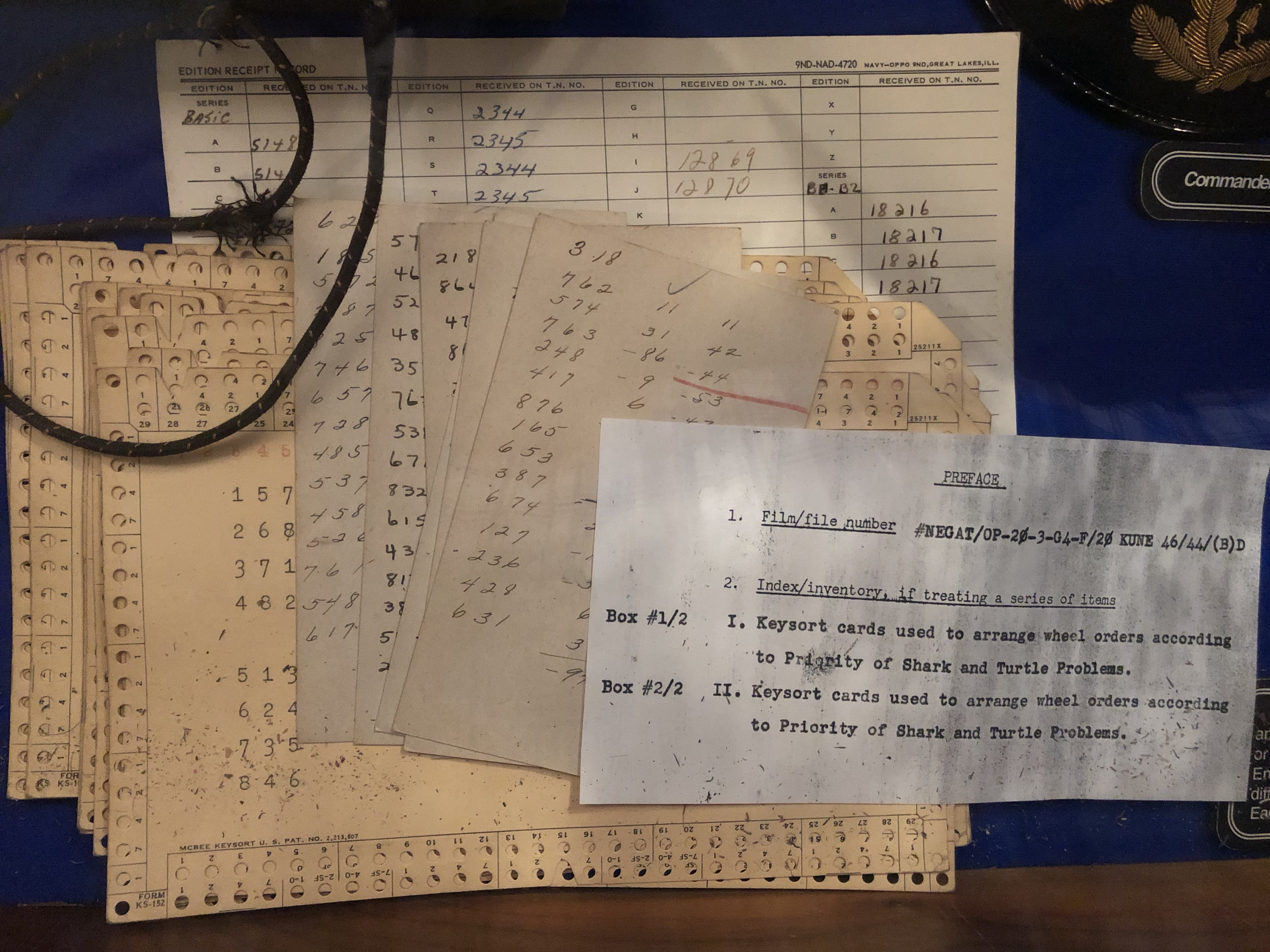
Keysort cards used in World War II codebreaking

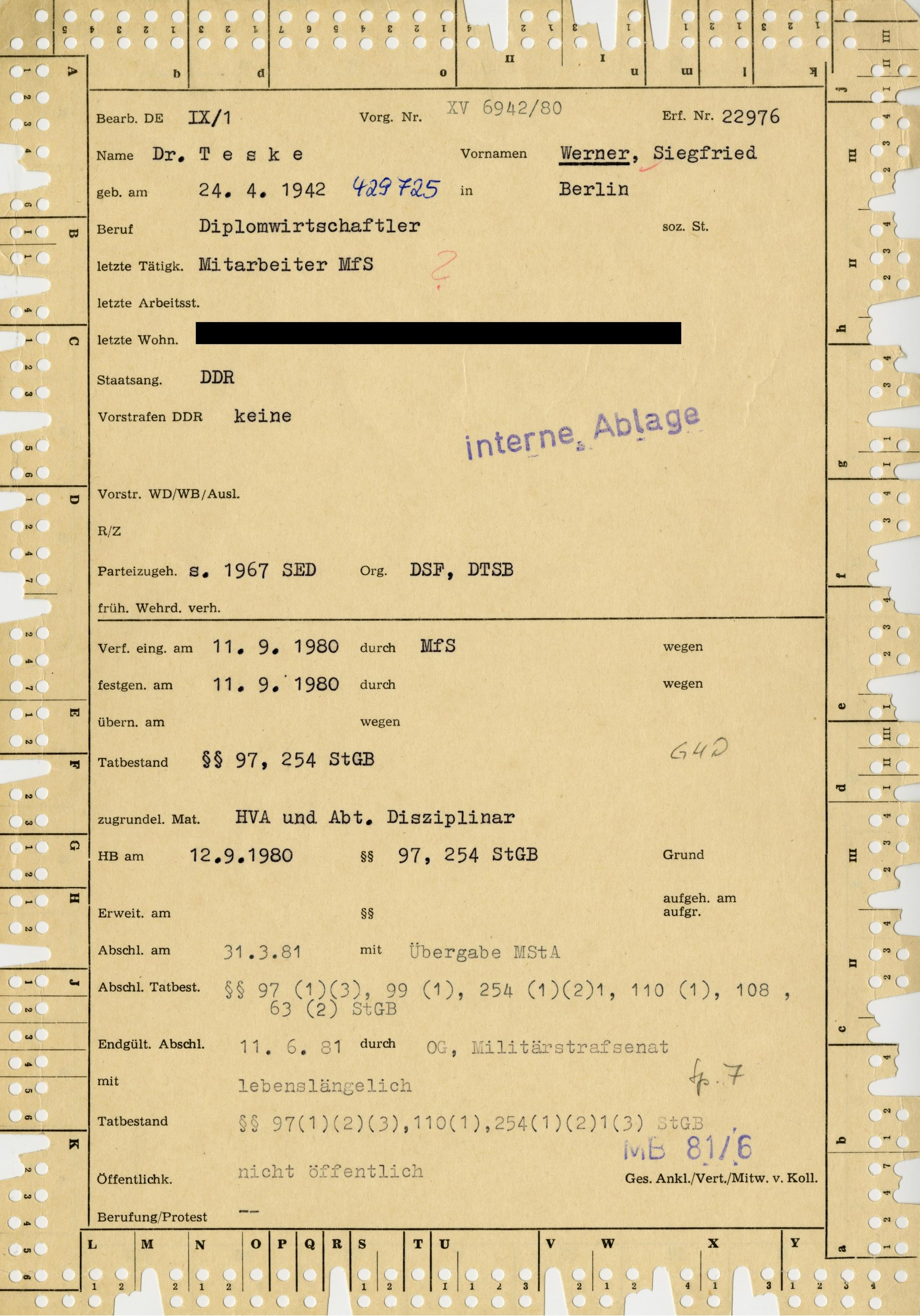
Kerblochkarteikarte for Werner Teske, a former Stasi employee sentenced for espionage, from 1981

Before the widespread use of computers, some public libraries used a system of small edge-notched cards in paper pockets in the back of library books to keep track of them. The corporate library of a division of E. I. du Pont de Nemours and Company maintained a subject catalog on two-level edge-punched cards (Royal-McBee Keysort cards) that grew to 15,000 cards before the librarians began to consider keeping the catalog on a computer.

Edge-notched cards were used for course scheduling in some high schools and colleges. Keysort cards were also used in World War II codebreaking.

The Stasi used edge-notched cards (German: Kerblochkarteikarten) from 1965 to index information including details of staff, crimes, people under surveillance, and vehicles. Cards often stored information about the occupation, interests, and suspected political affiliations of those recorded. The index cards contained basic personal data in plain text, while sensitive data was coded using the notches. A 1956 technical standard specified four card sizes, approximating paper sizes from A7 to A4. The cards became obsolete for data storage by 1980 with the introduction of computer databases, but were retained and used to retrieve information after this date.

== See also ==
- Bucket sort
- Hash value
- Paper data storage
- Radix sort
- Tag (metadata)
- Unit record equipment
