= Fingerprint (computing) =

Digital identifier derived from the data by an algorithm

In computer science, a fingerprinting algorithm is a procedure that maps an arbitrarily large data item (such as a computer file) to a much shorter bit string, its fingerprint, that uniquely identifies the original data for all practical purposes just as human fingerprints uniquely identify people for practical purposes. This fingerprint may be used for data deduplication purposes. This is also referred to as file fingerprinting, data fingerprinting, or structured data fingerprinting.

Fingerprints are typically used to avoid the comparison and transmission of bulky data. For instance, a web browser or proxy server can efficiently check whether a remote file has been modified by fetching only its fingerprint and comparing it with that of the previously fetched copy.

Fingerprint functions may be seen as high-performance hash functions used to uniquely identify substantial blocks of data where cryptographic hash functions may be unnecessary.

Special algorithms exist for audio and video fingerprinting.

== Properties ==
=== Virtual uniqueness ===
To serve its intended purposes, a fingerprinting algorithm must be able to capture the identity of a file with virtual certainty. In other words, the probability of a collision — two files yielding the same fingerprint — must be negligible, compared to the probability of other unavoidable causes of fatal errors (such as the system being destroyed by war or by a meteorite): say, 10^{−20} or less.

This requirement is somewhat similar to that of a checksum function, but is much more stringent. To detect accidental data corruption or transmission errors, it is sufficient that the checksums of the original file and any corrupted version will differ with near certainty, given some statistical model for the errors. In typical situations, this goal is easily achieved with 16- or 32-bit checksums. In contrast, file fingerprints need to be at least 64-bit long to guarantee virtual uniqueness in large file systems (see birthday attack).

When proving the above requirement, one must take into account that files are generated by highly non-random processes that create complicated dependencies among files. For instance, in a typical business network, one usually finds many pairs or clusters of documents that differ only by minor edits or other slight modifications. A good fingerprinting algorithm must ensure that such "natural" processes generate distinct fingerprints, with the desired level of certainty.

=== Compounding ===
Computer files are often combined in various ways, such as concatenation (as in archive files) or symbolic inclusion (as with the C preprocessor's #include directive). Some fingerprinting algorithms allow the fingerprint of a composite file to be computed from the fingerprints of its constituent parts. This "compounding" property may be useful in some applications, such as detecting when a program needs to be recompiled.

== Algorithms ==
=== Rabin's algorithm ===
Rabin's fingerprinting algorithm is the prototype of the class. It is fast and easy to implement, allows compounding, and comes with a mathematically precise analysis of the probability of collision. Namely, the probability of two strings r and s yielding the same w-bit fingerprint does not exceed max(|r|,|s|)/2^{w-1}, where |r| denotes the length of r in bits. The algorithm requires the previous choice of a w-bit internal "key", and this guarantee holds as long as the strings r and s are chosen without knowledge of the key.

Rabin's method is not secure against malicious attacks. An adversarial agent can easily discover the key and use it to modify files without changing their fingerprint.

=== Cryptographic hash functions ===
Mainstream cryptographic grade hash functions generally can serve as high-quality fingerprint functions, are subject to intense scrutiny from cryptanalysts, and have the advantage that they are believed to be safe against malicious attacks.

A drawback of cryptographic hash algorithms such as MD5 and SHA is that they take considerably longer to execute than Rabin's fingerprint algorithm. They also lack proven guarantees on the collision probability. Some of these algorithms, notably MD5, are no longer recommended for secure fingerprinting. They are still useful for error checking, where purposeful data tampering is not a primary concern.

=== Perceptual hashing ===
Perceptual hashing is the use of a fingerprinting algorithm that produces a snippet, hash, or fingerprint of various forms of multimedia. A perceptual hash is a type of locality-sensitive hash, which is analogous if features of the multimedia are similar. This is in contrast to cryptographic hashing, which relies on the avalanche effect of a small change in input value creating a drastic change in output value. Perceptual hash functions are widely used in finding cases of online copyright infringement as well as in digital forensics because of the ability to have a correlation between hashes so similar data can be found (for instance with a differing watermark).

== Application examples ==
NIST distributes a software reference library, the American National Software Reference Library, that uses cryptographic hash functions to fingerprint files and map them to software products. The HashKeeper database, maintained by the National Drug Intelligence Center, is a repository of fingerprints of "known to be good" and "known to be bad" computer files, for use in law enforcement applications (e.g. analyzing the contents of seized disk drives).

=== Content similarity detection ===
Fingerprinting is currently the most widely applied approach to content similarity detection. This method forms representative digests of documents by selecting a set of multiple substrings (n-grams) from them. The sets represent the fingerprints and their elements are called minutiae. A suspicious document is checked for plagiarism by computing its fingerprint and querying minutiae with a precomputed index of fingerprints for all documents of a reference collection. Minutiae matching with those of other documents indicate shared text segments and suggest potential plagiarism if they exceed a chosen similarity threshold. Computational resources and time are limiting factors to fingerprinting, which is why this method typically only compares a subset of minutiae to speed up the computation and allow for checks in very large collection, such as the Internet.

== See also ==
- Acoustic fingerprinting
- Automatic content recognition
- Canvas fingerprinting
- Digital video fingerprinting
- TCP/IP stack fingerprinting
- Device fingerprint
- Machine Identification Code
- Error correcting code
- Public key fingerprint
- Randomizing function
- Usage share of web browsers
