= Andrei Broder =

American computer scientist

Andrei Zary Broder
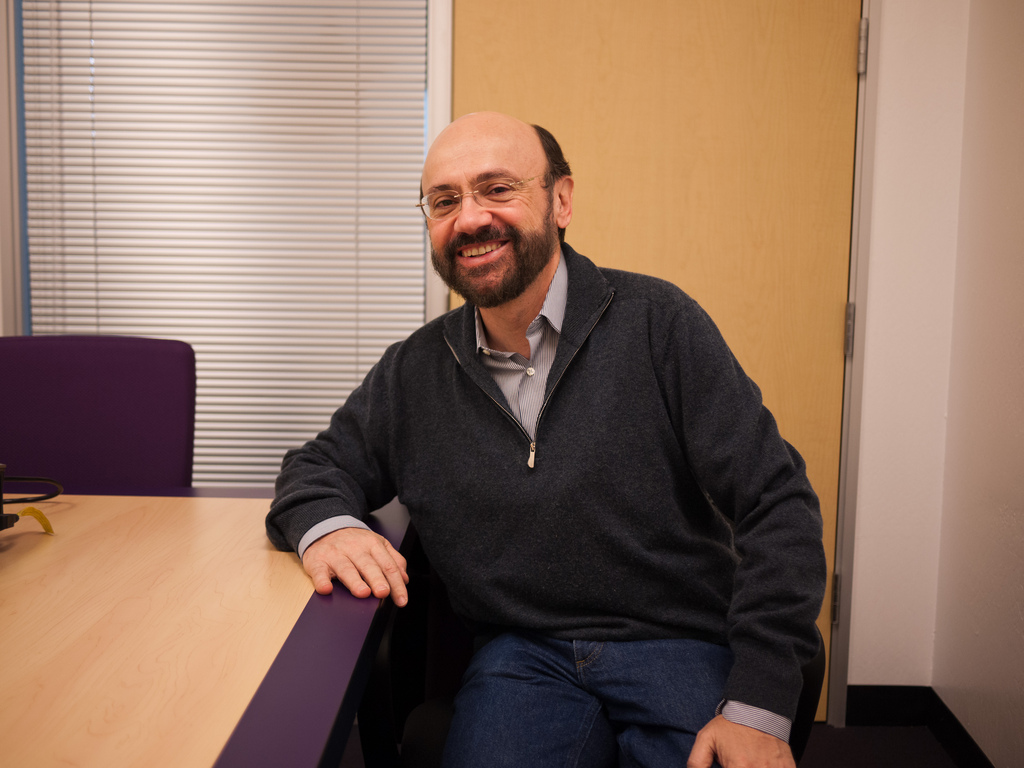
- Andrei Broder in 2010
- Born: April 12, 1953 (age 73); Bucharest, Romanian People's Republic
- Education: Technion – Israel Institute of Technology (B.Sc.); Stanford University (PhD)
- Known for: Computational advertising, algorithms for WWW, shingling, min-hashing, CAPTCHA, web graph analysis
- Awards: ACM Fellow, IEEE Fellow, National Academy of Engineering Member, ACM Paris Kanellakis Award
- Scientific career
- Fields: Computer science Computational advertising
- Workplaces: Google, Yahoo!, AltaVista, IBM Research
- Thesis: Weighted random mappings; properties and applications (1985)
- Doctoral advisor: Donald Knuth

Andrei Zary Broder (born April 12, 1953) is an American scientist who works at Google. Previously, he was a research fellow and vice president of computational advertising for Yahoo!, and before that, the vice president of research for AltaVista. He has also worked for IBM Research as a distinguished engineer and was CTO of IBM's Institute for Search and Text Analysis.

== Education and career ==
Broder was born in Bucharest, Romania, in 1953. His parents were medical doctors, his father a noted oncological surgeon. They emigrated to Israel in 1973, when Broder was in the second year of college in Romania, in the Electronics department at the Politehnica University of Bucharest.

He was accepted at Technion – Israel Institute of Technology, in the EE Department. Broder graduated from Technion in 1977, with a B.Sc. summa cum laude. He was then admitted to the PhD program at Stanford, where he initially planned to work in the systems area. His first adviser was John L. Hennessy. After receiving a "high pass" at the reputedly hard algorithms qual, Donald Knuth, already a Turing Award and National Medal winner, offered him the opportunity to become his advisee. Broder finished his PhD under Knuth in 1985. He then joined the newly founded DEC Systems Research Center in Palo Alto. At DEC SRC, Andrei was involved with AltaVista from the very beginning, helping it deal with duplicate documents and spam. When AltaVista split from Compaq that bought DEC, Andrei became its CTO and then chief scientist and VP of research.

In 2002, he joined IBM Research in New York to build its enterprise search product. In 2005, he returned to Silicon Valley and the Web Industry, as a Yahoo Fellow and vice president. There, he put the bases of a new discipline, Computational advertising, the science of matching ads to users and contexts. At Yahoo, Broder also helped build Yahoo! Research into one of the leading Web research organizations. Broder was elected a member of the National Academy of Engineering in 2010 for his contributions to the science and engineering of the World Wide Web. In 2012, Broder joined Google as a distinguished scientist, where he switched focus to another aspect of the WWW experience, large-scale personalization.

== Contributions ==
In 1989, he discovered (independently from David Aldous) an algorithm for generating a uniform spanning tree of a given graph.

Over the last fifteen years, Broder pioneered several algorithms systems and concepts fundamental to the science and technology of the World Wide Web. Some of the highlights include: In 1997, Broder led the development of the first practical solution for finding near-duplicate documents on web-scale using "shingling" to reduce the problem to a set-intersection problem and "min-hashing" or to construct "sketches" of sets. This was a pioneering effort in the area of locality-sensitive hashing. In 1998, he co-invented the first practical test to prevent robots from masquerading as human and access web sites, often referred to as CAPTCHA. In 2000, Broder, then at AltaVista, together with colleagues from IBM and DEC SRC, conducted the first large-scale analysis of the Web graph, and identified the bow-tie model of the web graph. Around 2001–2002, Broder published an opinion piece where he qualified the differences between classical information retrieval and Web search and introduced a now widely accepted classification of web queries into navigational, information, and transactional.

== Awards and honors ==
He is a fellow of the Association for Computing Machinery, National Academy of Engineering, and the IEEE. He was one of the recipients of the 2012 ACM Paris Kanellakis Award for his work on w-shingling and min-hashing, and he won this award again in 2020, together with Yossi Azar, Anna Karlin, Michael Mitzenmacher, and Eli Upfal for their work on the power of two choices.
