= NDIC =

NDIC can refer to:

- National Defence Industries Council, the most senior forum for consultation between the Government of the United Kingdom and industry on defence matters
- National Defense Intelligence College, a United States intelligence education facility formerly known as the Joint Military Intelligence College
- National Drug Intelligence Center, a United States Department of Justice institution
- Nigeria Deposit Insurance Corporation, an independent agency of the Federal Government of Nigeria
- North Dakota Intercollegiate Conference, an earlier name for the North Dakota College Athletic Conference, a college athletic conference the United States
- Notre Dame-Immaculate Conception School, a private, Catholic elementary school located in Easthampton, Massachusetts
