= NSRL (disambiguation) =

NSRL is primarily the acronym for Nationalsozialistischer Reichsbund für Leibesübungen, the Sports Office of the Third Reich. The NSRL was disbanded in 1945 after Nazi Germany's defeat in World War II, when the American Military Government issued a special law outlawing the Nazi party and all of its branches.

NSRL may refer, however, to the following organizations created later:

- National Software Reference Library, a project of the National Institute of Standards and Technology designed to collect software from various sources
- National Synchrotron Radiation Laboratory, University of Science and Technology of China, Hefei
- NASA Space Radiation Laboratory at Brookhaven National Laboratory (BNL), Upton, NY
- Natural Science Research Laboratory, Museum of Texas Tech University
- Nova Scotia Resources Limited, a consulting firm for oil exploration in the Scotian Shelf
- The now defunct Nuclear Structure Research Laboratory of the University of Rochester
- National Salmonella Reference Laboratory, NUI Galway
- Networks and Services Research Laboratory of the UCL Department of Electronic & Electrical Engineering
- Neuroscience Statistics Research Lab at MIT
- The NSRL - INSTAAR Laboratory for AMS Radiocarbon Preparation and Research of the University of Colorado at Boulder
- National SIGINT (Signal Intelligence) Requirements List of the National Security Agency/Central Security Service (NSA/CSS)
- National Soybean Research Lab at the University of Illinois
- Nike's Sport Research Lab
- Network Services Research Laboratory at AT&T
- Novell Support Resource Library at Novell corporation
- National Senior Robotics League, the robot competition at the Institute of Technical Education, Singapore
- NegativeSum Racing League
- NASCAR Sim Racing League

== Other ==
- No Significant Risk Level, used mainly in Safe Drinking Water and Toxic Enforcement Act codes or regulations
- North-South Rail Link, the name for a proposed rail tunnel in Boston, Massachusetts
