= Videntifier =

Icelandic software company

Videntifier Technologies
- Type: Private company
- Industry: Software, computer security, security software
- Founded: 2007; 19 years ago in Reykjavík, Iceland
- Headquarters: Reykjavík (Iceland)
- Products: Cloud Cleanup Content verifier for copyright protection VUI (Videntifier User Interface) Videntify API
- Number of employees: 15+
- Website: www.videntifier.com www.videntifier-security.com

Videntifier is an Icelandic software company which has developed a method to quickly identify videos and images automatically. Videntifier's patented technology can store the fingerprints of enormous amounts of video content and images, and can identify any of the reference material within seconds. Usually a single frame is enough to identify the entire video.

Currently, the company is headquartered in Reykjavík (Iceland) and has office in the Vilnius, Lithuania.

== History ==
Videntifier Technologies was founded in September 2007 and provides technology to search and track vast amounts of multimedia data efficiently. Previously, the company has focused on providing services for police departments engaged in locating illegal images and videos on seized computers.

The company has its roots in the database laboratories of Reykjavík University and, later, it has opened a secondary lab in IRISA-CNRS, Rennes.

In 2013, Videntifier Technologies signed an agreement with the Interpol to provide advanced imaging technology in the effort against child sexual abuse material.
