= Moses Charikar =

Indian-American computer scientist

- Born: Bombay (now Mumbai)
- Education: (BTech) IIT Bombay (PhD) Stanford University
- Known for: SimHash algorithm
- Awards: Paris Kanellakis Award
- Scientific career
- Fields: approximation algorithms streaming algorithms metric embeddings
- Institutions: Stanford University (2015-Present); Princeton University (2001-2015)
- Doctoral advisor: Rajeev Motwani

Moses Samson Charikar is an Indian-American computer scientist who works as a professor at Stanford University. He was previously a professor at Princeton University. The topics of his research include approximation algorithms, streaming algorithms, and metric embeddings. He is known for the creation of the SimHash algorithm used by Google for near duplicate detection.

Charikar was born in Bombay, India, and competed for India at the 1990 and 1991 International Mathematical Olympiads, winning bronze and silver medals respectively. He did his undergraduate studies at the Indian Institute of Technology Bombay. In 2000 he completed a doctorate from Stanford University, under the supervision of Rajeev Motwani; he joined the Princeton faculty in 2001.

In 2012 he was awarded the Paris Kanellakis Award along with Andrei Broder and Piotr Indyk for their research on locality-sensitive hashing.
