= Perceptual hashing =

Class of fingerprinting algorithm

Perceptual hashing is the use of a fingerprinting algorithm that produces a snippet, hash, or fingerprint of various forms of multimedia. A perceptual hash is a type of locality-sensitive hash, which is analogous if features of the multimedia are similar. This is in contrast to cryptographic hashing, which relies on the avalanche effect of a small change in input value creating a drastic change in output value. Perceptual hash functions are widely used in finding cases of online copyright infringement as well as in digital forensics because of the ability to have a correlation between hashes so similar data can be found (for instance with a differing watermark).

== Development ==
The 1980 work of Marr and Hildreth is a seminal paper in this field.

In 2009, Microsoft Corporation developed PhotoDNA in collaboration with Hany Farid, professor at Dartmouth College. PhotoDNA is a perceptual hashing capability developed to combat the distribution of child sexual abuse material (CSAM) online. Provided by Microsoft for no cost, PhotoDNA remains a critical tool used by major software companies, NGOs and law enforcement agencies around the world.

In June 2016 Azadeh Amir Asgari published work on robust image hash spoofing. Asgari notes that perceptual hash function like any other algorithm is prone to errors.

Researchers remarked in December 2017 that Google image search is based on a perceptual hash.

In research published in November 2021 investigators focused on a manipulated image of Stacey Abrams which was published to the internet prior to her loss in the 2018 Georgia gubernatorial election. They found that the pHash algorithm was vulnerable to nefarious actors.

In August 2021 Apple announced an on-device CSAM scanner called NeuralHash but, after strong privacy backlash, paused the rollout in September and formally cancelled it in December 2022.

Security researchers soon demonstrated that NeuralHash and similar deep perceptual hashes can be forced into collisions or evasion with imperceptible image changes.

In October 2023 Meta introduced Stable Signature, an invisible watermark rooted in latent-diffusion generators, signalling a shift toward hybrid provenance schemes that combine watermarking with perceptual hashing.

The open-source state of the art in 2025 was set by DINOHash, which adversarially fine-tunes self-supervised DINOv2 features and reports higher bit-accuracy under heavy crops, compression and adversarial gradient-based attacks than NeuralHash or classical DCT–DWT schemes.

== Characteristics ==
Research reported in January 2019 at Northumbria University has shown for video it can be used to simultaneously identify similar contents for video copy detection and detect malicious manipulations for video authentication. The system proposed performs better than current video hashing techniques in terms of both identification and authentication.

Research reported in May 2020 by the University of Houston in deep learning based perceptual hashing for audio has shown better performance than traditional audio fingerprinting methods for the detection of similar/copied audio subject to transformations.

In addition to its uses in digital forensics, perceptual hashing can be applied to a wide variety of situations. Similar to comparing images for copyright infringement, a group of researchers found that it could be used to compare and match images in a database. They showed that their algorithm is more efficient than the standard means of database image search.

A Chinese team reported in July 2019 that they had discovered a perceptual hash for speech encryption which proved to be effective. They were able to create a system in which the encryption was more accurate and more compact.

In August 2021, Apple Inc described a CSAM-detection system called NeuralHash. A technical summary document explained that the system did not scan images on iCloud servers, but rather performed on-device matching using a database of CSAM image hashes provided by the National Center for Missing and Exploited Children (NCMEC) and other organizations.

In an essay entitled "The Problem With Perceptual Hashes", Oliver Kuederle demonstrated how a photographic portrait of a real woman reduces through a perceptual hash algorithm to a similar hash as the photograph of a butterfly painted in watercolor. Both sample images are in commercial databases. Kuederle is concerned with collisions like this. "These cases will be manually reviewed. That is, according to Apple, an Apple employee will then look at your (flagged) pictures... Perceptual hashes are messy. When such algorithms are used to detect criminal activities, especially at Apple scale, many innocent people can potentially face serious problems... Needless to say, I’m quite worried about this."

Researchers have continued to publish a comprehensive analysis entitled "Learning to Break Deep Perceptual Hashing: The Use Case NeuralHash", in which they investigate the vulnerability of NeuralHash as a representative of deep perceptual hashing algorithms to various attacks. Their results show that hash collisions between different images can be achieved with minor changes applied to the images. According to the authors, these results demonstrate the real chance of such attacks and enable the flagging and possible prosecution of innocent users. They also state that the detection of illegal material can easily be avoided, and the system be outsmarted by simple image transformations, such as provided by free-to-use image editors. The authors assume their results to apply to other deep perceptual hashing algorithms as well, questioning their overall effectiveness and functionality in applications such as client-side scanning and chat controls.

== See also ==
- Geometric hashing
- Reverse image search
- Digital video fingerprinting
- Audio fingerprinting
