= PJW =

PJW may refer to:

- PJW hash function
- Punjab Warriors, hockey team from Punjab, India
- Paul Joseph Watson (born 1982), English YouTube personality
- Peter J. Weinberger (born 1942), American computer scientist
