= Fuzzy hashing =

Algorithmic technique using hashing

Fuzzy hashing, also known as similarity hashing, is a technique for detecting data that is similar, but not exactly the same, as other data. This is in contrast to cryptographic hash functions, which are designed to have significantly different hashes for even minor differences. Fuzzy hashing has been used to identify malware and has potential for other applications, like data loss prevention and detecting multiple versions of code.

== Background ==
A hash function is a mathematical algorithm which maps arbitrary-sized data to a fixed size output. Many solutions use cryptographic hash functions like SHA-256 to detect duplicates or check for known files within large collection of files. However, cryptographic hash functions cannot be used for determining if a file is similar to a known file, because one of the requirements of a cryptographic hash function is that a small change to the input should change the hash value so extensively that the new hash value appears uncorrelated with the old hash value (avalanche effect).

Fuzzy hashing exists to solve this problem of detecting data that is similar, but not exactly the same, as other data. Fuzzy hashing algorithms specifically use algorithms in which two similar inputs will generate two similar hash values. This property is the exact opposite of the avalanche effect desired in cryptographic hash functions.

Fuzzy hashing can also be used to detect when one object is contained within another.

== Approaches ==
There are a few approaches used for building fuzzy hash algorithms:

- Context-triggered piecewise hashing (CTPH), which constructs a hash by splitting the input into multiple pieces, calculating traditional hashes for each piece, and then combining those traditional hashes into a single string.
- Locality-sensitive hashing places similar input items into the same "buckets", which can be used for data clustering and nearest neighbor searches.

== Notable tools and algorithms ==
- spamsum is a tool written by Andrew Tridgell that uses fuzzy hashing to determine whether an email is similar to known spam. It operates by generating a fuzzy hash for an email that it compares against the fuzzy hashes from known spam emails to generate a match result between 0 (complete mismatch) to 100 (perfect match). If the match result is high enough, the email is classified as spam.
- Nilsimsa Hash is an anti-spam–focused locality-sensitive hashing algorithm.
- ssdeep is a fuzzy hashing tool based on context-triggered piecewise hashing to compare files.
- sdhash is a fuzzy hashing tool based on using Bloom filters to determine whether one file is contained within another or how similar two files are to each other.
- TLSH is a locality-sensitive hashing scheme for comparing whether files are similar to each other. It has been used for malware clustering.
- Rspamd uses fuzzy hashing to detect spam emails, using the shingles algorithm for this purpose.

== See also ==
- Checksum § Fuzzy checksum
