= Nilsimsa =

Anti-spam hashing algorithm

Nilsimsa is an anti-spam focused locality-sensitive hashing algorithm originally proposed by the cmeclax remailer operator in 2001 and then reviewed by Ernesto Damiani et al. in their 2004 paper titled, "An Open Digest-based Technique for Spam Detection". The goal of Nilsimsa is to generate a hash digest of an email message such that the digests of two similar messages are similar to each other. In comparison with cryptographic hash functions such as SHA-1 or MD5, making a small modification to a document does not substantially change the resulting hash of the document. The paper suggests that the Nilsimsa satisfies three requirements:

1. The digest identifying each message should not vary significantly (sic) for changes that can be produced automatically.
2. The encoding must be robust against intentional attacks.
3. The encoding should support an extremely low risk of false positives.

Subsequent testing on a range of file types identified the Nilsimsa hash as having a significantly higher false positive rate when compared to other similarity digest schemes such as TLSH, Ssdeep and Sdhash.

Nilsimsa similarity matching was taken in consideration by Jesse Kornblum when developing the fuzzy hashing in 2006, that used the algorithms of spamsum by Andrew Tridgell (2002).

Several implementations of Nilsimsa exist as open-source software.
