= National Drug Intelligence Center =

Defunct US federal agency

- Seal of the National Drug Intelligence Center

Agency overview
- Formed: August 9, 1993 (33 years ago)
- Dissolved: June 15, 2012 (14 years ago)
- Superseding agency: Drug Enforcement Administration
- Jurisdiction: U.S. Federal Government
- Headquarters: Johnstown, Pennsylvania
- Agency executive: Michael F. Walther, Director (2005–2012)
- Parent department: U.S. Department of Justice
- Website: Archived website

The United States National Drug Intelligence Center (NDIC), established in 1993, was a component of the U.S. Department of Justice and a member of the Intelligence Community. The General Counterdrug Intelligence Plan, implemented in February 2000, designated NDIC as the nation's principal center for strategic domestic counterdrug intelligence.

The NDIC ceased to exist on June 15, 2012. Its former DOMEX and strategic analysis functions transferred over to the Drug Enforcement Administration (DEA).

== Creation ==
On September 5, 1989 President George H. W. Bush with his Director of the Office of National Drug Control Policy (ONDCP) William Bennett, unveiled his National Drug Control Strategy which outlined the President's strategy for coordinating the combined efforts of various federal programs to reduce drug use and drug trafficking in the United States. The inaugural strategy was to announce that ONDCP would develop an intelligence center that would unite U.S. drug-related analytical capabilities and to improve intelligence capabilities. In January 1990, ONDCP announced its plans to create a National Drug Intelligence Center to "consolidate and coordinate all relevant drug intelligence information gathered by law enforcement agencies and analyze it to produce a more complete picture of drug trafficking organizations." What distinguished the intelligence to be developed by NDIC from that of other agencies was the focus on strategic intelligence.

In the FY1993 Department of Defense Appropriation (PL 102-396), Congress provided statutory backing to the President's vision for NDIC. In that law, the mission of NDIC was "to coordinate and consolidate." Initially being staffed with intelligence analysts and agents from the Federal Bureau of Investigation (FBI) and administered by the FBI, NDIC opened its doors officially in Johnstown, Pennsylvania on August 9, 1993. The center's early work often involved providing operational support to other law enforcement and intelligence agencies. NDIC also prepared assessments of drug intelligence from all national security and law enforcement agencies, and produced information regarding the structure, membership, finances, communications, and activities of drug trafficking from intelligence provided by a requesting agency specifically for an assigned tasking. In February 1998 NDIC became an independent component of the U.S. Department of Justice and employed more than 340 federal employees and contract personnel. As a component of the U.S. Department of Justice, NDIC was headed by a Director, who is appointed by the U.S. Attorney General. The final Director of NDIC was Michael Walther.

== Mission ==
"The mission of NDIC was to provide strategic drug-related intelligence, document and media exploitation support, and training assistance to the drug control, public health, law enforcement, and intelligence communities of the United States in order to reduce the adverse effects of drug trafficking, drug abuse, and other drug-related criminal activity."

The NDIC ceased to exist on June 15, 2012. DOMEX functions were transferred to the Drug Enforcement Administration.

== Products ==
=== HashKeeper ===
HashKeeper was a tool of interest to Computer Forensics examiners and was available free-of-charge to law enforcement, military, and other government agencies throughout the world. It was conceptualized and operationalized by Brian Deering. The original database code was written by Chris Bifano. It was Bifano who named the product "HashKeeper."

== See also ==
- Drug Enforcement Administration
- National Gang Intelligence Center
