= HashKeeper =

Forensic database application

HashKeeper is a database application of value primarily to those conducting forensic examinations of computers on a somewhat regular basis.

== Overview ==
HashKeeper uses the MD5 file signature algorithm to establish unique numeric identifiers (hash values) for files "known to be good" and "known to be bad."

The HashKeeper application was developed to reduce the amount of time required to examine files on digital media. Once an examiner defines a file as known to be good, the examiner need not repeat that analysis.

HashKeeper compares hash values of known to be good files against the hash values of files on a computer system. Where those values match "known to be good" files, the examiner can say, with substantial certainty, that the corresponding files on the computer system have been previously identified as known to be good and therefore do not need to be examined.

Where those values match known to be bad files, the examiner can say with substantial certainty that the corresponding files on the system being examined that the files are bad and therefore require further scrutiny. A hash match on known to be bad files does not relieve the examiner of the responsibility of verifying that the file or files are, in fact, of a criminal nature.

== Availability ==
HashKeeper was available, free-of-charge, to law enforcement, military and other government agencies throughout the world. It is available to the public by sending a Freedom of Information Act request to NDIC.

In the 2012 United States budget, NDIC was de-funded and closed its doors on June 16, 2012. The availability and future of HashKeeper is uncertain.

== See also ==
- National Software Reference Library
- Rainbow table
