= Bow tie (biology) =

In the biological sciences, the term bow tie (so called for its shape) is a concept that tries to grasp the essence of some operational and functional structures observed in biological organisms and other kinds of complex and self-organizing systems. In general, bow tie architectures refer to ordered and recurrent structures that often underlie complex technological or biological systems, and that are capable of conferring them a balance among efficiency, robustness and evolvability. In other words, bow ties are able to take into account a great diversity of inputs (fanning in to the knot), showing a much smaller diversity in the protocols and processes (the knot) able to elaborate these inputs, and finally an extremely heterogeneous diversity of outputs (fanning out of the bowtie). These architectures thus manage a wide range of inputs through a core (knot) constituted by a limited number of elements. In such structures, inputs are conveyed into a sort of funnel, towards a "synthesis" core, where they can be duly organized, processed and managed by means of protocols , and from where, in turn, a variety of outputs, or responses, is propagated.

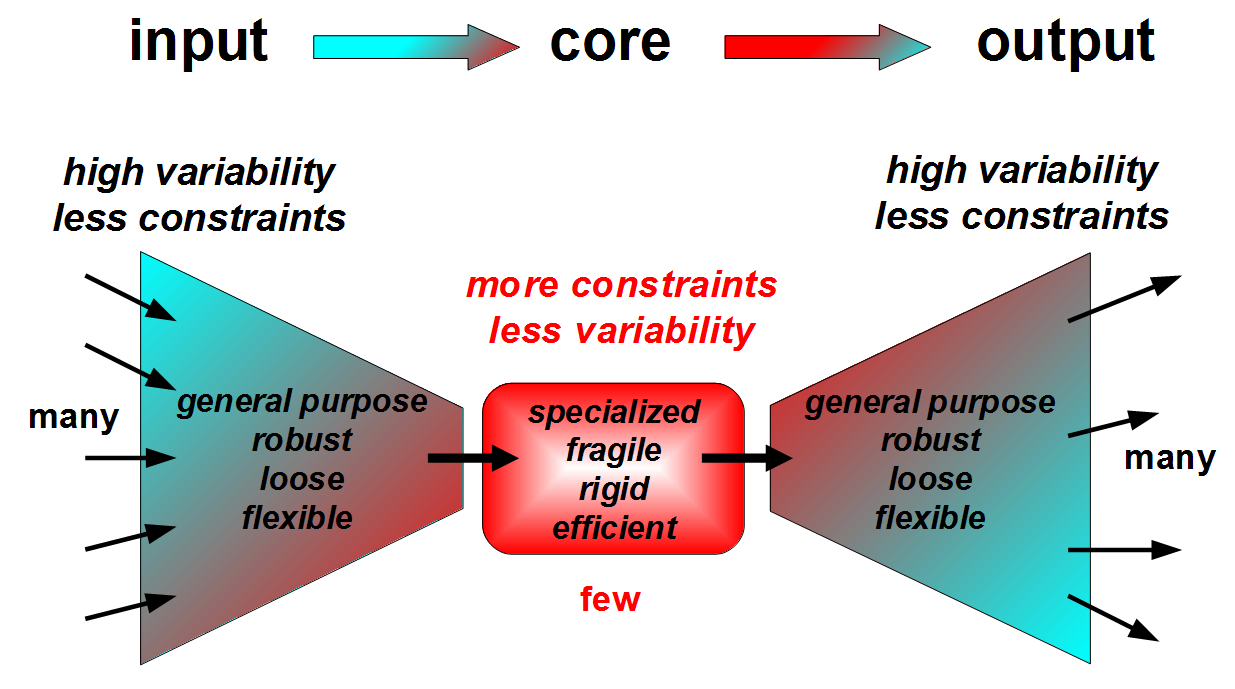
scheme of a general bow tie architecture

According to Csete and Doyle, bow ties are able to optimally organize fluxes of mass, energy, signals in an overall structure that forcedly deals with a highly fluctuating and "sloppy" environment. In a biological perspective, a bow tie manages a large fan in of stimuli (input), it accounts for a "compressed" core, and it expresses again a large fan out of possible phenotypes, metabolite products, or –more generally – reusable modules. Bow tie architectures have been observed in the structural organization at different scales of living and evolving organisms (e.g. bacterial metabolism network) as well as in technological and dynamical systems (e.g. the Internet). Bow ties seem to be able to mediate trade-offs among robustness and efficiency, at the same time assuring to the system the capability to evolve. Conversely, the same efficient architecture may be prone and vulnerable to fragilities due to specific changes, perturbations, and focused attacks directed against the core set of modules and protocols. The bow tie architecture is one of several different structures and functioning principles that living matter employs to achieve self-organization and efficient exploitation of available resources.
