= PJW hash function =

Computing algorithm

PJW hash function is a non-cryptographic hash function created by Peter J. Weinberger of AT&T Bell Labs.

== Other versions ==
A variant of PJW hash had been used to create ElfHash or Elf64 hash that is used in Unix object files with ELF format.

Allen Holub has created a portable version of PJW hash algorithm that had a bug and ended up in several textbooks, as the author of one of these textbooks later admitted.

== Algorithm ==
PJW hash algorithm involves shifting the previous hash and adding the current byte followed by moving the high bits:

algorithm PJW_hash(s) is
    uint h := 0
    bits := uint size in bits
    for i := 1 to |S| do
        h := h << bits/8 + s[i]
        high := get top bits/8 bits of h from left
        if high ≠ 0 then
            h := h xor (high >> bits * 3/4)
            h := h & ~high
    return h

== Implementation ==
Below is the algorithm implementation used in Unix ELF format:

unsigned long ElfHash(const unsigned char *s)
{
    unsigned long   h = 0, high;
    while (*s)
    {
        h = (h << 4) + *s++;
        if (high = h & 0xF0000000)
            h ^= high >> 24;
        h &= ~high;
    }
    return h;
}

This C code incorrectly assumes that long is a 32-bit data type. When long is wider than 32 bits, as it is on many 64-bit systems, the code contains a bug.

== See also ==
Non-cryptographic hash functions
