= Digital video fingerprinting =

Technique to uniquely identify a video recording

Video fingerprinting or video hashing are a class of dimension reduction techniques in which a system identifies, extracts and then summarizes characteristic components of a video as a unique or a set of multiple perceptual hashes or fingerprints, enabling that video to be uniquely identified. This technology has proven to be effective at searching and comparing video files.

== History and process ==
Video fingerprinting was first developed into practical use by Philips in 2002.

Different methods exist for video fingerprinting. Van Oostveen relied on changes in patterns of image intensity over successive video frames. This makes the video fingerprinting robust against limited changes in color—or the transformation of color into gray scale of the original video. Others have tried to reduce the size of the fingerprint by only looking around shot changes.

Video fingerprinting does not rely on any addition to the video stream. A video fingerprint cannot be removed, because it is not added. In addition, a reference video fingerprint can be created at any point, from any copy of the video.

== Compared to digital watermarking ==
Video fingerprinting should not be confused with digital watermarking, which relies on inserting identifying features into the content and therefore changing the content. Some watermarks can be inserted in a way that they are imperceptible to a viewer. A robust watermark can be difficult to detect and remove, but the removal of invisible watermarks is a significant weakness.

Since watermarks must be inserted into the video, they only identify copies of the particular video made after that point in time. For example, if a watermark is inserted at broadcast it cannot be used to identify copies of the video made before the broadcast.

Watermarks offer some advantages over fingerprinting. A unique watermark can be added to the content at any stage in the distribution process, and multiple independent watermarks can be inserted into the same video content. This can be particularly useful in tracing the history of a copy of a video. Detecting watermarks in a video can indicate the source of an unauthorized copy.

While video fingerprinting systems must search a potentially large database of reference fingerprints, a watermark detection system only has to do the computation to detect the watermark. This computation can be significant and when multiple watermark keys must be tested, then watermarking can fail to scale to the volumes required by commercial applications such as user generated video services.

== Applications ==
=== Rights of nature management and distribution tracking ===
Video fingerprinting is of interest in the digital rights management (DRM) area, particularly regarding the distribution of unauthorized content on the Internet. Video fingerprinting systems enable content providers (e.g., film studios) or publishers (e.g., user-generated content [UGC] sites) to determine if any of the publisher's files contain content registered with the fingerprint service. If registered content is detected, the publisher can take the appropriate action—remove it from the site, monetize it add correct attribution, etc.

Video fingerprinting may be used for broadcast monitoring (e.g., advertisement monitoring, news monitoring) and general media monitoring. Broadcast monitoring solutions can inform content providers and content owners with playlists of when and where their video content has been used. A typical application is described in this Video Fingerprinting Use Case for Television Productions and Broadcasters.

From a content provider's point of view, both video and audio fingerprinting need to be used in most applications. Consider the online publication of "mash-ups." Mash-ups can consist of content from several sources that are compiled together and set to a unique audio track. Since the audio track is different from the original version, the copyrighted material in these mash-ups would go undetected using only audio fingerprinting techniques. In other cases, mash-ups consist of the soundtrack from a commercial video source, like a movie, used with a different video stream. In this case, a video fingerprint would not match, but an audio fingerprint would. When the audio and video streams are not from the same masterwork, the question of fair use may arise.

This discrepancy has real applications in the global online community in terms of film distribution. Films shown in countries other than their country of origin are often dubbed into other languages. This change in audio renders the films virtually unrecognizable by audio fingerprinting technologies unless copies of all known versions have been fingerprinted. Employing video fingerprinting, however, enables the content owner to fingerprint just once and have each subsequent version remain recognizable. If the customer wishes to know which language soundtrack is present on a particular video, then an audio fingerprint must be used.

Another use is for companies to track the leak of confidential recordings or videos, or for celebrities to track the presence on the Internet of unauthorized videos (for instance, videos of themselves taken by amateurs using a camcorder or a mobile phone).

=== Interactive media ===
Video fingerprinting applied to smart TV is enabling an emerging category of interactive television applications. Television devices integrated with real-time fingerprinting software can automatically recognize the video content on-screen in order to enable interactive features and applications on top of the programming. Entrepreneur Mark Cuban has made investments to leverage this technology to create interactive features for his cable networks HDNet and its successor AXS.

=== Criminal investigation ===
Video fingerprinting is also used by authorities to track the distribution of illegal content such as happy slapping, terrorist and child sexual abuse related videos.

In 2008 the Dutch company Ziuz, together with the Dutch Police, TNO and University of Amsterdam developed video fingerprinting for detecting child sexual abuse related videos.

In April 2014 the British company Friend MTS Ltd. donated its video fingerprinting technology (known as F1) to the International Centre for Missing & Exploited Children (ICMEC) to help increase the efficiency of child pornography investigations and to halt the continued sharing of similar files over the internet. ICMEC distributes the technology to law enforcement agencies, software providers and online service providers to hinder the spread of such material.

== See also ==
- Acoustic fingerprint
- Perceptual hashing
- Video content analysis
- Video copy detection
