= W-shingling =

In natural language processing a w-shingling is a set of unique shingles (therefore n-grams) each of which is composed of contiguous subsequences of tokens within a document, which can then be used to ascertain the similarity between documents. The symbol w denotes the quantity of tokens in each shingle selected, or solved for.

The document, "a rose is a rose is a rose" can therefore be maximally tokenized as follows:

(a,rose,is,a,rose,is,a,rose)

The set of all contiguous sequences of 4 tokens (Thus 4=n, thus 4-grams) is

{ (a,rose,is,a), (rose,is,a,rose), (is,a,rose,is), (a,rose,is,a), (rose,is,a,rose) }

Which can then be reduced, or maximally shingled in this particular instance to

{ (a,rose,is,a), (rose,is,a,rose), (is,a,rose,is) }.

== Resemblance ==
For a given shingle size, the degree to which two documents A and B resemble each other can be expressed as the ratio of the magnitudes of their shinglings' intersection and union, or

$$r(A,B)={{|S(A)\cap S(B)|}\over {|S(A)\cup S(B)|}}$$

where |A| is the size of set A. The resemblance is a number in the range [0,1], where 1 indicates that two documents are identical. This definition is identical with the Jaccard coefficient describing similarity and diversity of sample sets.

== See also ==
- Bag-of-words model
- Jaccard index
- Concept mining
- k-mer
- MinHash
- n-gram
- Rabin fingerprint
- Rolling hash
- Vector space model
