= Hash tree =

In computer science, hash tree may refer to:

- Hashed array tree
- Hash tree (persistent data structure), an implementation strategy for sets and maps
- Merkle tree

== See also ==
- Hash trie
