= GADDAG =

A GADDAG is a data structure presented by Steven Gordon in 1994, for use in generating moves for Scrabble and other word-generation games where such moves require words that "hook into" existing words. It is often in contrast to move-generation algorithms using a directed acyclic word graph (DAWG) such as the one used by Maven. It is generally twice as fast as the traditional DAWG algorithms, but take about 5 times as much space for regulation Scrabble dictionaries.

Quackle, an open-source Scrabble program, uses a GADDAG to generate moves.

== Description ==
The name GADDAG comes from DAG for directed acyclic graph, prefixed by its own reverse.

A GADDAG is a specialization of a Trie, containing states and branches to other GADDAGs. It is distinct for its storage of every reversed prefix of every word in a dictionary. This means every word has as many representations as it does letters; since the average word in most Scrabble regulation dictionaries is 5 letters long, this makes the GADDAG about 5 times as big as a simple DAWG.

=== Definition ===
For any word in a dictionary that is formed by a non-empty prefix x and a suffix y, a GADDAG contains a direct, deterministic path for any string REV(x)+y, where + is used as a separator. (Any non-letter character could be used instead of + here.)

For example, for the word "explain," a GADDAG will contain direct paths to the strings

e+xplain
xe+plain
pxe+lain
lpxe+ain
alpxe+in
ialpxe+n
nialpxe

This setup enables searching for a word given any letter that occurs in it.

=== Use in move generation ===
Any move-generation algorithm must adhere to three types of constraints:

- Board constraints: one may only build by 'hooking' onto existing letters of the board, and one may only place tiles on empty squares.
- Rack constraints: one may only place tiles with letters on one's rack.
- Dictionary constraint: all words resulting from the placement of tiles exist in the game's dictionary.

DAWG-based algorithms take advantage of the second and third constraint: the DAWG is built around the dictionary, and is traversed using tiles in the rack. It fails, however, to address the first constraint: supposing one want to 'hook into' the letter P in HARPY, and the board has 2 spaces before the P, one must search the dictionary for all words containing letters from the rack where the third letter is P. This is inefficient when searching through the DAWG, as many searches through the trie will be fruitless.

This is addressed by the GADDAG's storage of prefixes: by traversing the P branch of a GADDAG, one sees all words that have a P somewhere in their composition, and can "travel up" the prefix to form the word with tiles in the rack. To use the example from the § Definition section, searching for P turns up "pxe+lain". The letters between P and the + can be placed above the P on the board, and the rest below it (if space on the board permits).

== See also ==
- Suffix Tree
- Trie
- Scrabble
- Prefix Hash Tree
