= Hash tree (persistent data structure) =

Formatted data in computer science

In computer science, a hash tree (or hash trie) is a persistent data structure that can be used to implement sets and maps, intended to replace hash tables in purely functional programming. In its basic form, a hash tree stores the hashes of its keys, regarded as strings of bits, in a trie, with the actual keys and (optional) values stored at the trie's "final" nodes.

Hash array mapped tries and Ctries are refined versions of this data structure, using particular type of trie implementations.
