= C-trie =

A C-trie is a compressed trie data structure. It achieves lower memory and query time requirements at the expense of reduced flexibility.
