= Cardinal tree =

A cardinal tree (or trie) of degree k, by analogy with cardinal numbers and by opposition with ordinal trees, is a rooted tree in which each node has k positions for an edge to a child. Each node has up to k children and each child of a given node is labeled by a unique integer from the set {1, 2, . . . , k}. For instance, a binary tree is a cardinal tree of degree 2.

== See also ==
- Ordinal tree
