= Bidirectional map =

In computer science, a bidirectional map is an associative data structure in which the $(key, value)$ pairs form a one-to-one correspondence. Thus the binary relation is functional in each direction: each $value$ can also be mapped to a unique $key$. A pair $(a, b)$ thus provides a unique coupling between $a$ and $b$ so that $b$ can be found when $a$ is used as a key and $a$ can be found when $b$ is used as a key.

Mathematically, a bidirectional map can be defined a bijection $f: X \to Y$ between two different sets of keys $X$ and $Y$ of equal cardinality, thus constituting an injective and surjective function:

$$\begin{cases}
& \forall x, x' \in X, f(x) = f(x') \Rightarrow x = x' \\
& \forall y \in Y, \exists x \in X : y=f(x)
\end{cases} \Rightarrow \exists f^{-1}(x)$$
