= Hash trie =

In computer science, hash trie can refer to:

- Hash tree (persistent data structure), a trie used to map hash values to keys
- A space-efficient implementation of a sparse trie, in which the descendants of each node may be interleaved in memory; the name is suggested by a similarity to a closed hash table
- A data structure which "combines features of hash tables and LC-tries (least compression tries) in order to perform efficient lookups and updates"

== See also ==
- Hash array mapped trie
- Hashed array tree
- Merkle tree
