= Mask (computing) =

Data used for bitwise operations

In computer science, a mask or bitmask is data that is used for bitwise operations, particularly in a bit field. Using a mask, multiple bits in a byte, nibble, word, etc. can be set either on or off, or inverted from on to off (or vice versa) in a single bitwise operation. An additional use of masking involves predication in vector processing, where the bitmask is used to select which element operations in the vector are to be executed (mask bit is enabled) and which are not (mask bit is clear).

== Common bitmask functions ==
=== Masking bits to 1 ===
To turn certain bits on, the bitwise OR operation can be used, following the principle that for an individual bit Y, Y OR 1 = 1 and Y OR 0 = Y. Therefore, to make sure a bit is on, OR can be used with a 1. To leave a bit unchanged, OR is used with a 0.

Example: Masking on the higher nibble (bits 4, 5, 6, 7) while leaving the lower nibble (bits 0, 1, 2, 3) unchanged.

    10010101   10100101
 OR 11110000   11110000
  = 11110101   11110101

=== Masking bits to 0 ===
More often in practice, bits are "masked off" (or masked to 0) than "masked on" (or masked to 1). When a bit is ANDed with a 0, the result is always 0, i.e. Y AND 0 = 0. To leave the other bits as they were originally, they can be ANDed with 1 as Y AND 1 = Y

Example: Masking off the higher nibble (bits 4, 5, 6, 7) while leaving the lower nibble (bits 0, 1, 2, 3) unchanged.

    10010101   10100101
AND 00001111   00001111
  = 00000101   00000101

=== Querying the status of a bit ===
It is possible to use bitmasks to easily check the state of individual bits regardless of the other bits. To do this, turning off all the other bits using the bitwise AND is done as discussed above and the value is compared with 0. If it is equal to 0, then the bit was off, but if the value is any other value, then the bit was on. What makes this convenient is that it is not necessary to figure out what the value actually is, just that it is not 0.

Example: Querying the status of the 4th bit

    10011101   10010101
AND 00001000   00001000
  = 00001000   00000000

=== Toggling bit values ===
So far the article has covered how to turn bits on and turn bits off, but not both at once. Sometimes it does not really matter what the value is, but it must be made the opposite of what it currently is. This can be achieved using the XOR (exclusive or) operation. XOR returns 1 if and only if an odd number of bits are 1. Therefore, if two corresponding bits are 1, the result will be a 0, but if only one of them is 1, the result will be 1. Therefore inversion of the values of bits is done by XORing them with a 1. If the original bit was 1, it returns 1 XOR 1 = 0. If the original bit was 0 it returns 0 XOR 1 = 1. Also note that XOR masking is bit-safe, meaning that it will not affect unmasked bits because Y XOR 0 = Y, just like an OR.

Example: Toggling bit values

    10011101   10010101
XOR 00001111   11111111
  = 10010010   01101010

To write arbitrary 1s and 0s to a subset of bits, first write 0s to that subset, then set the high bits:

  register = (register & ~bitmask) | value;

=== Merging bits ===
Sometimes selected bits must be copied without altering other bits in a register or storage. This can be expressed for example as

$destination = (destination \land \lnot mask) \lor (source \land mask)$, or

  destination = (destination & ~bitmask) | (source & bitmask);

For this example, bitmask has 0 where the destination bits remain, and 1 where they are replaced by source bits.

(If source only contains bits that are going to be inserted, the & bitmask part can be omitted.)

== Uses of bitmasks ==
A party trick to guess a number from which cards it is printed on uses the bits of the binary representation of the number. In the SVG file, click a card to toggle it.

=== Arguments to functions ===
In programming languages such as C, bit fields are a useful way to pass a set of named Boolean arguments to a function. For example, in the graphics API OpenGL, there is a command, glClear() which clears the screen or other buffers. It can clear up to four buffers (the color, depth, accumulation, and stencil buffers), so the API authors could have had it take four arguments. But then a call to it would look like

glClear(1, 1, 0, 0); // This is not how glClear actually works and would make for unstable code.

which is not very descriptive. Instead there are four defined field bits, GL_COLOR_BUFFER_BIT, GL_DEPTH_BUFFER_BIT, GL_ACCUM_BUFFER_BIT, and GL_STENCIL_BUFFER_BIT and glClear() is declared as

void glClear(GLbitfield bits);

Then a call to the function looks like this:

glClear(GL_COLOR_BUFFER_BIT | GL_DEPTH_BUFFER_BIT);

Internally, a function taking a bitfield like this can use binary and to extract the individual bits. For example, an implementation of glClear() might look like:

void glClear(GLbitfield bits) {
    if ((bits & GL_COLOR_BUFFER_BIT) != 0) {
        // Clear color buffer.
    }
    if ((bits & GL_DEPTH_BUFFER_BIT) != 0) {
        // Clear depth buffer.
    }
    if ((bits & GL_ACCUM_BUFFER_BIT) != 0) {
        // Clear accumulation buffer.
    }
    if ((bits & GL_STENCIL_BUFFER_BIT) != 0) {
        // Clear stencil buffer.
    }
}

The advantage to this approach is that function argument overhead is decreased. Since the minimum datum size is one byte, separating the options into separate arguments would be wasting seven bits per argument and would occupy more stack space. Instead, functions typically accept one or more 32-bit integers, with up to 32 option bits in each. While elegant, in the simplest implementation this solution is not type-safe. A GLbitfield is simply defined to be an unsigned int, so the compiler would allow a meaningless call to glClear(42) or even glClear(GL_POINTS). In C++ an alternative would be to create a class to encapsulate the set of arguments that glClear could accept and could be cleanly encapsulated in a library.

=== Inverse masks ===
Masks are used with IP addresses in IP ACLs (Access Control Lists) to specify what should be permitted and denied. To configure IP addresses on interfaces, masks start with 255 and have the large values on the left side: for example, IP address 203.0.113.129 with a 255.255.255.224 mask. Masks for IP ACLs are the reverse: for example, mask 0.0.0.255. This is sometimes called an inverse mask or a wildcard mask. When the value of the mask is broken down into binary (0s and 1s), the results determine which address bits are to be considered in processing the traffic. A 0-bit indicates that the address bit must be considered (exact match); a 1-bit in the mask is ignored.

For example: A network address (traffic that is to be processed): 192.0.2.0 with mask: 0.0.0.255. In binary, the address is 11000000.00000000.00000010.00000000 and the mask is 00000000.00000000.00000000.11111111.

Based on the binary mask, it can be seen that the first three sets (octets) must match the given binary network address exactly (11000000.00000000.00000010). The last set of numbers are ignored by the mask. Thus, all traffic that begins with "192.0.2." are matched. Therefore, with this mask, network addresses 192.0.2.1 through 192.0.2.255 (192.0.2.x) are processed.

Subtracting the normal mask from 255.255.255.255 determines the ACL inverse mask. In this example, the inverse mask is determined for network address 198.51.100.0 with a normal mask of 255.255.255.0:

255.255.255.255 − 255.255.255.0  = 0.0.0.255 
                  (normal mask) (inverse mask)

==== ACL equivalents ====
The source/source-wildcard of 0.0.0.0/255.255.255.255 means "any".

The source/wildcard of 198.51.100.2/0.0.0.0 is the same as "host 198.51.100.2"

=== Image masks ===
Raster graphic sprites (left) and masks (right)

In computer graphics, when a given image is intended to be placed over a background, the transparent areas can be specified through a binary mask. This way, for each intended image there are actually two bitmaps: the actual image, in which the unused areas are given a pixel value with all bits set to 0s, and an additional mask, in which the correspondent image areas are given a pixel value of all bits set to 0s and the surrounding areas a value of all bits set to 1s. In the sample at right, black pixels have the all-zero bits and white pixels have the all-one bits.

At run time, to put the image on the screen over the background, the program first masks the screen pixel's bits with the image mask at the desired coordinates using the bitwise AND operation. This preserves the background pixels of the transparent areas while resets with zeros the bits of the pixels which will be obscured by the overlapped image.

Then, the program renders the image pixel's bits by combining them with the background pixel's bits using the bitwise OR operation. This way, the image pixels are appropriately placed while keeping the background surrounding pixels preserved. The result is a perfect compound of the image over the background.

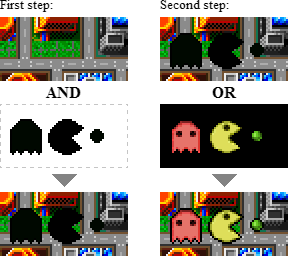

This technique is used for painting pointing device cursors, in typical 2-D videogames for characters, bullets and so on (the sprites), for GUI icons, and for video titling and other image mixing applications. A faster method is to simply overwrite the background pixels with the foreground pixels if their alpha=1

Although related (due to being used for the same purposes), transparent colors and alpha channels are techniques which do not involve the image pixel mixage by binary masking.

=== Hash tables ===
To create a hashing function for a hash table, often a function is used that has a large domain. To create an index from the output of the function, a modulo can be taken to reduce the size of the domain to match the size of the array; however, it is often faster on many processors to restrict the size of the hash table to powers of two sizes and use a bitmask instead.

An example of both modulo and masking in C:

#include <stdint.h>
#include <stdlib.h>
#include <string.h>

// a hash function
uint32_t hashFunction(char* token, size_t len, uint32_t bucketCount);

int main(void) {
    const uint32_t NUM_BUCKETS = 0xFFFFFFFF;  // 2^32 - 1
    const uint32_t MAX_RECORDS = 1 << 10;  // 2^10
    const uint32_t HASH_BITMASK = 0x3FF;  // 2^10 - 1
    const size_t TOKEN_COUNT = 100; // example size

    char* tokens[] = (char**)malloc(sizeof(char*) * TOKEN_COUNT);
    // Handle memory allocation for tokens...

    char token[] = "some hashable value";
    uint32_t hashedToken = hashFunction(token, strlen(token), NUM_BUCKETS);

    // Using modulo:
    size_t index = hashedToken % MAX_RECORDS;

    // Or, using bitmask:
    size_t index = hashedToken & HASH_BITMASK;

    tokens[index] = token;

    // Free the memory from tokens...
    free(tokens);
    return 0;
}

== See also ==
- Affinity mask
- Binary-coded decimal
- Bit field
- Bit manipulation
- Bitwise operation
- Subnet
- Tagged pointer
- umask
