= Prefix hash tree =

A prefix hash tree (PHT) is a distributed data structure that enables more sophisticated queries over a distributed hash table (DHT). The prefix hash tree uses the lookup interface of a DHT to construct a trie-based data structure that is both efficient (updates are doubly logarithmic in the size of the domain being indexed), and resilient (the failure of any given node in a prefix hash tree does not affect the availability of data stored at other nodes).

== See also ==
- Prefix tree
- P-Grid
