= Solèr's theorem =

Mathematical theorem

In mathematics, Solèr's theorem is a result concerning certain infinite-dimensional vector spaces. It states that any orthomodular form that has an infinite orthonormal set is a Hilbert space over the real numbers, complex numbers or quaternions. Originally proved by Maria Pia Solèr, the result is significant for quantum logic and the foundations of quantum mechanics. In particular, Solèr's theorem helps to fill a gap in the effort to use Gleason's theorem to rederive quantum mechanics from information-theoretic postulates. It is also an important step in the Heunen–Kornell axiomatisation of the category of Hilbert spaces.

Physicist John C. Baez notes,

Nothing in the assumptions mentions the continuum: the hypotheses are purely algebraic. It therefore seems quite magical that [the division ring over which the Hilbert space is defined] is forced to be the real numbers, complex numbers or quaternions.

Writing a decade after Solèr's original publication, Pitowsky calls her theorem "celebrated".

== Statement ==
Let $\mathbb K$ be a division ring. That means it is a ring in which one can add, subtract, multiply, and divide but in which the multiplication need not be commutative. Suppose this ring has a conjugation, i.e. an operation $x \mapsto x^*$ for which

$$\begin{align}
& (x+y)^* = x^* + y^*, \\
& (xy)^* = y^* x^* \text{ (the order of multiplication is inverted), and } \\
& (x^*)^* = x.
\end{align}$$

Consider a vector space V with scalars in $\mathbb K$, and a mapping

$$(u,v) \mapsto \langle u,v\rangle \in \mathbb K$$

which is $\mathbb K$ -linear in left (or in the right) entry, satisfying the identity

$$\langle u,v\rangle = \langle v,u\rangle^*.$$

This is called a Hermitian form. Suppose this form is non-degenerate in the sense that

$$\langle u,v\rangle = 0 \text{ for all values of } u \text{ only if } v=0.$$

For any subspace S let $S^\bot$ be the orthogonal complement of S. Call the subspace "closed" if $S^{\bot\bot} = S.$

Call this whole vector space, and the Hermitian form, "orthomodular" if for every closed subspace S we have that $S + S^\bot$ is the entire space. (The term "orthomodular" derives from the study of quantum logic. In quantum logic, the distributive law is taken to fail due to the uncertainty principle, and it is replaced with the "modular law," or in the case of infinite-dimensional Hilbert spaces, the "orthomodular law.")

A set of vectors $u_i \in V$ is called "orthonormal" if
$$\langle u_i, u_j \rangle = \delta_{ij}.$$
The result is this:

If this space has an infinite orthonormal set, then the division ring of scalars is either the field of real numbers, the field of complex numbers, or the ring of quaternions.
