= Maria Luisa Dalla Chiara =

Italian logician and philosopher of science

- Born: 1938 (age 87–88); Pula, Italy (now Croatia)
- Awards: Giulio Preti Prize (2012–2013)

Academic background
- Education: University of Padua (BA)
- Influences: Ettore Casari, Ludovico Geymonat

Academic work
- Era: 20th and 21st-century philosophy
- School or tradition: Analytic philosophy, Philosophy of science
- Institutions: University of Florence
- Main interests: Logic, Quantum logic, Quasi-set theory, Philosophy of physics

Maria Luisa Dalla Chiara Scabia (born 1938) is an Italian logician and philosopher of science, known for her work on quantum logic and quasi-set theory. She is a professor emerita at the University of Florence.

== Education and career ==
Dalla Chiara was born in Pola, then part of the Italian province of Pola and now in Croatia. After earning a degree in philosophy at the University of Padua in 1961, she continued her studies at the University of Milan with Ettore Casari and Ludovico Geymonat.

She joined the Faculty of Literature at the University of Florence in 1970, and retired to become a professor emerita in 2010. She has also served as president of the International Quantum Structures Association, of the Italian Society of Logic and Philosophy of Science, and of the Florence Center for the History and Philosophy of Science.

== Recognition ==
Dalla Chiara won the Giulio Preti Prize for dialogue between science and democracy for 2012–2013.

== Books ==
Dalla Chiara's books include:

- Modelli Sintattici e Semantici delle Teorie Elementari (in Italian, Feltrinelli Editore, 1968)
- La Logica (1974), translated into Spanish as Lógica by José M. Valderas (Labor, 1976)
- Italian Studies in the Philosophy of Science (edited, Reidel, 1981)
- Knowledge, Belief, and Strategic Interaction (edited with Cristina Bicchieri, Cambridge University Press, 1992)
- Bridging the Gap: Philosophy, Mathematics and Physics Lectures on the Foundations of Science (with G. Corsi and G. C. Ghirardi, Kluwer, 1993)
- Introduzione alla Filosofia della Scienza (with G. Toraldo di Francia, Laterza, 1999); translated into Spanish as Confines: Introducción a la Filosofía de la Ciencia (Critica Editorial, 2001)
- Sperimentare la Logica (with R. Giuntini and F. Paoli, Luguori, 2004)
- Reasoning in Quantum Theory: Sharp and Unsharp Quantum Logics (with R. Giuntini and R. Greechie, Kluwer, 2004)
- From Quantum Information to Musical Semantics (with R. Giuntini, E. Negri, and A. R. Luciani, College Publications, 2012)
- Quantum Computation and Logic: How Quantum Computers Have Inspired Logical Investigations (with R. Giuntini, R. Leporini, and G. Sergioli, Springer, 2018)
