= Burrows–Wheeler transform =

Algorithm used in data compression

- Class: preprocessing for lossless compression
- Data structure: string
- Worst-case performance: O(n)
- Worst-case space complexity: O(n)

The Burrows–Wheeler transform (BWT) rearranges a character string into runs of similar characters, in a manner that can be reversed to recover the original string. Since compression techniques such as move-to-front transform and run-length encoding are more effective when such runs are present, the BWT can be used as a preparatory step to improve the efficiency of a compression algorithm, and is used this way in software such as bzip2. The algorithm can be implemented efficiently using a suffix array thus reaching linear time complexity.

It was invented by David Wheeler in 1983, and later published by him and Michael Burrows in 1994. Their paper included a compression algorithm, called the Block-sorting Lossless Data Compression Algorithm or BSLDCA, that compresses data by using the BWT followed by move-to-front coding and Huffman coding or arithmetic coding.

== Description ==
The transform is done by constructing a matrix (known as the Burrows–Wheeler matrix) whose rows are the circular shifts of the input text, sorted in lexicographic order, then taking the final column of that matrix.

To allow the transform to be reversed, one additional step is necessary: either the index of the original string in the Burrows–Wheeler matrix must be returned along with the transformed string (the approach shown in the original paper by Burrows and Wheeler) or a special end-of-text character must be added at the start or end of the input text before the transform is executed.

=== Example ===
Given an input string S = ^BANANA$ (step 1 in the table below), rotate it N times (step 2), where N = 8 is the length of the S string considering also the red ^ character representing the start of the string and the red $ character representing the EOF pointer; these rotations, or circular shifts, are then sorted lexicographically (step 3). The output of the encoding phase is the last column L = BNN^AA$A after step 3, and the index (0-based) I of the row containing the original string S, in this case I = 6.

It is not necessary to use both $ and ^, but at least one must be used, else we cannot invert the transform, since all circular permutations of a string have the same Burrows–Wheeler transform.

Transformation
1. Input

^BANANA$

2. All
rotations

^BANANA$
$^BANANA
A$^BANAN
NA$^BANA
ANA$^BAN
NANA$^BA
ANANA$^B
BANANA$^

3. Sort into
lexical order

ANANA$^B
ANA$^BAN
A$^BANAN
BANANA$^
NANA$^BA
NA$^BANA
^BANANA$
$^BANANA

4. Take the
last column

ANANA$^B
ANA$^BAN
A$^BANAN
BANANA$^
NANA$^BA
NA$^BANA
^BANANA$
$^BANANA

5. Output

BNN^AA$A

=== Pseudocode ===
The following pseudocode gives a simple (though inefficient) way to calculate the BWT and its inverse. It assumes that the input string s contains a special character "EOF", which is the last character and occurs nowhere else in the text.

function BWT (string s)
    create a table, where the rows are all possible rotations of s
    sort rows alphabetically
    return (last column of the table)

function inverseBWT (string s)
    create empty table
    repeat length(s) times
        // first insert creates first column
        insert s as a column of table before first column of the table
        sort rows of the table alphabetically
    return (row that ends with the "EOF" character)

== Explanation ==
If the original string had several substrings that occurred often, then the BWT-transformed string will have several places where a single character is repeated many times in a row, creating more-easily-compressible data. For instance, consider transforming an English text frequently containing the word "the":

For example:

Input	THE.MAN.AND.THE.DOG.WAITED.AT.THE.STATION.FOR.THE.TRAIN.TO.THE.CITY
Output	NDEENEEODTRNEGRWM..T.EN.HHHHHT.OTTTTTATAC.AOIATDIFOT.ASI..Y..A..I.T

Sorting the rotations of this text groups rotations starting with "he " together, and the last character of such a rotation (which is also the character before the "he ") will usually be "t" (though perhaps occasionally not, such as if the text contained "ache "), so the result of the transform will contain a run, or runs, of many consecutive "t" characters. Similarly, rotations beginning with "e " are grouped together, but "e " is often preceded by "h", so we see the output above contains a run of five consecutive "h" characters.

Thus it can be seen that the success of this transform depends upon one value having a high probability of occurring before a sequence, so that in general it needs fairly long samples (a few kilobytes at least) of appropriate data (such as text).

BWT is interesting not because it generates a more easily encoded output—an ordinary sort would do that—but rather because it does this reversibly, allowing the original document to be re-generated from the last column data.

The inverse can be understood this way. Take the final table in the BWT algorithm, and erase all but the last column. Given only this information, you can easily reconstruct the first column. The last column tells you all the characters in the text, so just sort these characters alphabetically to get the first column. Then, the last and first columns (of each row) together give you all pairs of successive characters in the document, where pairs are taken cyclically so that the last and first character form a pair. Sorting the list of pairs gives the first and second columns. To obtain the third column, the last column is again prepended to the table, and the rows are sorted lexicographically. Continuing in this manner, you can reconstruct the entire list. Then, the row with the "end of file" character at the end is the original text. Reversing the example above is done like this:

Inverse transformation
Input
BNN^AA$A
Add 1	Sort 1	Add 2	Sort 2
B N N ^ A A $ A	A A A B N N ^ $	BA NA NA ^B AN AN $^ A$	AN AN A$ BA NA NA ^B $^
Add 3	Sort 3	Add 4	Sort 4
BAN NAN NA$ ^BA ANA ANA $^B A$^	ANA ANA A$^ BAN NAN NA$ ^BA $^B	BANA NANA NA$^ ^BAN ANAN ANA$ $^BA A$^B	ANAN ANA$ A$^B BANA NANA NA$^ ^BAN $^BA
Add 5	Sort 5	Add 6	Sort 6
BANAN NANA$ NA$^B ^BANA ANANA ANA$^ $^BAN A$^BA	ANANA ANA$^ A$^BA BANAN NANA$ NA$^B ^BANA $^BAN	BANANA NANA$^ NA$^BA ^BANAN ANANA$ ANA$^B $^BANA A$^BAN	ANANA$ ANA$^B A$^BAN BANANA NANA$^ NA$^BA ^BANAN $^BANA
Add 7	Sort 7	Add 8	Sort 8
BANANA$ NANA$^B NA$^BAN ^BANANA ANANA$^ ANA$^BA $^BANAN A$^BANA	ANANA$^ ANA$^BA A$^BANA BANANA$ NANA$^B NA$^BAN ^BANANA $^BANAN	BANANA$^ NANA$^BA NA$^BANA ^BANANA$ ANANA$^B ANA$^BAN $^BANANA A$^BANAN	ANANA$^B ANA$^BAN A$^BANAN BANANA$^ NANA$^BA NA$^BANA ^BANANA$ $^BANANA
Output
^BANANA$

== Optimization ==
A number of optimizations can make these algorithms run more efficiently without changing the output. There is no need to represent the table in either the encoder or decoder. In the encoder, each row of the table can be represented by a single pointer into the strings, and the sort performed using the indices. In the decoder, there is also no need to store the table, and the decoded string can be generated one character at a time from left to right. Comparative sorting can even be avoided in favor of linear sorting, with performance proportional to the alphabet size and string length. A "character" in the algorithm can be a byte, or a bit, or any other convenient size.

One may also make the observation that mathematically, the encoded string can be computed as a simple modification of the suffix array, and suffix arrays can be computed with linear time and memory. The BWT can be defined with regards to the suffix array SA of text T as (1-based indexing):

$$BWT[i] = \begin{cases} T[SA[i]-1], & \text{if }SA[i] > 0\\ \$, & \text{otherwise}\end{cases}$$

There is no need to have an actual 'EOF' character. Instead, a pointer can be used that remembers where in a string the 'EOF' would be if it existed. In this approach, the output of the BWT must include both the transformed string, and the final value of the pointer. The inverse transform then shrinks it back down to the original size: it is given a string and a pointer, and returns just a string.

A complete description of the algorithms can be found in Burrows and Wheeler's paper, or in a number of online sources. The algorithms vary somewhat by whether EOF is used, and in which direction the sorting was done. In fact, the original formulation did not use an EOF marker.

== Bijective variant ==
Since any rotation of the input string will lead to the same transformed string, the BWT cannot be inverted without adding an EOF marker to the end of the input or doing something equivalent, making it possible to distinguish the input string from all its rotations. Increasing the size of the alphabet (by appending the EOF character) makes later compression steps awkward.

There is a bijective version of the transform, by which the transformed string uniquely identifies the original, and the two have the same length and contain exactly the same characters, just in a different order.

The bijective transform is computed by factoring the input into a non-increasing sequence of Lyndon words; such a factorization exists and is unique by the Chen–Fox–Lyndon theorem, and may be found in linear time and constant space. The algorithm sorts the rotations of all the words; as in the Burrows–Wheeler transform, this produces a sorted sequence of n strings. The transformed string is then obtained by picking the final character of each string in this sorted list. The one important caveat here is that strings of different lengths are not ordered in the usual way; the two strings are repeated forever, and the infinite repeats are sorted. For example, "ORO" precedes "OR" because "OROORO..." precedes "OROROR...".

For example, the text "^BANANA$" is transformed into "ANNBAA^$" through these steps (the red $ character indicates the EOF pointer) in the original string. The EOF character is unneeded in the bijective transform, so it is dropped during the transform and re-added to its proper place in the file.

The string is broken into Lyndon words so the words in the sequence are decreasing using the comparison method above. (Note that we're sorting '^' as succeeding other characters.) "^BANANA" becomes (^) (B) (AN) (AN) (A).

Bijective transformation
Input
All
rotations
Sorted alphabetically
Last column
of rotated Lyndon word
Output

^BANANA$

^^^^^^^^... (^)
BBBBBBBB... (B)
ANANANAN... (AN)
NANANANA... (NA)
ANANANAN... (AN)
NANANANA... (NA)
AAAAAAAA... (A)

AAAAAAAA... (A)
ANANANAN... (AN)
ANANANAN... (AN)
BBBBBBBB... (B)
NANANANA... (NA)
NANANANA... (NA)
^^^^^^^^... (^)

AAAAAAAA... (A)
ANANANAN... (AN)
ANANANAN... (AN)
BBBBBBBB... (B)
NANANANA... (NA)
NANANANA... (NA)
^^^^^^^^... (^)

ANNBAA^$

Inverse bijective transform
Input
ANNBAA^
Add 1	Sort 1	Add 2	Sort 2
A N N B A A ^	A A A B N N ^	AA NA NA BB AN AN ^^	AA AN AN BB NA NA ^^
Add 3	Sort 3	Add 4	Sort 4
AAA NAN NAN BBB ANA ANA ^^^	AAA ANA ANA BBB NAN NAN ^^^	AAAA NANA NANA BBBB ANAN ANAN ^^^^	AAAA ANAN ANAN BBBB NANA NANA ^^^^
Output
^BANANA

Up until the last step, the process is identical to the inverse Burrows–Wheeler process, but here it will not necessarily give rotations of a single sequence; it instead gives rotations of Lyndon words (which will start to repeat as the process is continued). Here, we can see (repetitions of) four distinct Lyndon words: (A), (AN) (twice), (B), and (^). (NANA... doesn't represent a distinct word, as it is a cycle of ANAN....) At this point, these words are sorted into reverse order: (^), (B), (AN), (AN), (A). These are then concatenated to get

^BANANA

The Burrows–Wheeler transform can indeed be viewed as a special case of this bijective transform; instead of the traditional introduction of a new letter from outside our alphabet to denote the end of the string, we can introduce a new letter that compares as preceding all existing letters that is put at the beginning of the string. The whole string is now a Lyndon word, and running it through the bijective process will therefore result in a transformed result that, when inverted, gives back the Lyndon word, with no need for reassembling at the end.

For example, applying the bijective transform gives:

Input	SIX.MIXED.PIXIES.SIFT.SIXTY.PIXIE.DUST.BOXES
Lyndon words	SIX.MIXED.PIXIES.SIFT.SIXTY.PIXIE.DUST.BOXES
Output	STEYDST.E.IXXIIXXSMPPXS.B..EE..SUSFXDIOIIIIT

The bijective transform includes eight runs of identical characters. These runs are, in order: XX, II, XX, PP, .., EE, .., and IIII.

In total, 18 characters are used in these runs.

== Dynamic Burrows–Wheeler transform ==
When a text is edited, its Burrows–Wheeler transform will change. Salson et al. propose an algorithm that deduces the Burrows–Wheeler transform of an edited text from that of the original text, doing a limited number of local reorderings in the original Burrows–Wheeler transform, which can be faster than constructing the Burrows–Wheeler transform of the edited text directly.

== Sample implementation ==
This Python implementation sacrifices speed for simplicity: the program is short, but takes more than the linear time that would be desired in a practical implementation. It essentially does what the pseudocode section does.

Using the STX/ETX control codes to mark the start and end of the text, and using s[i:] + s[:i] to construct the ith rotation of s, the forward transform takes the last character of each of the sorted rows:

from curses.ascii import STX, ETX

def bwt(s: str, start=chr(STX), end=chr(ETX)) -> str:
    r"""
    Apply Burrows–Wheeler transform to input string.

    >>> bwt('BANANA')
    '\x03ANNB\x02AA'
    >>> bwt('BANANA', start='^', end='$')
    'ANNB^AA$'
    >>> bwt('BANANA', start='%', end='$')
    'A$NNB%AA'
    """
    assert (
        start not in s and end not in s
    ), "Input string cannot contain STX and ETX characters"
    s = f"{start}{s}{end}"  # Add start and end of text marker

    # Table of rotations of string
    table = sorted(f"{s[i:]}{s[:i]}" for i, c in enumerate(s))
    last_column = [row[-1:] for row in table]  # Last characters of each row
    return "".join(last_column)  # Convert list of characters into string

The inverse transform repeatedly inserts r as the left column of the table and sorts the table. After the whole table is built, it returns the row that ends with ETX, minus the STX and ETX.

def inverse_bwt(r: str, start=chr(STX), end=chr(ETX)) -> str:
    r"""
    Apply inverse Burrows–Wheeler transform.

    >>> inverse_bwt('\x03ANNB\x02AA')
    'BANANA'
    >>> inverse_bwt('ANNB^AA$', start='^', end='$')
    'BANANA'
    >>> inverse_bwt('A$NNB%AA', start='%', end='$')
    'BANANA'
    """
    str_len = len(r)
    table = [""] * str_len  # Make empty table
    for _ in range(str_len):
        table = sorted(rc + tc for rc, tc in zip(r, table))  # Add a column of r

    # Iterate over and check whether last character ends with ETX or not
    s = next((row for row in table if row.endswith(end)), "")

    # Retrieve data from array and get rid of start and end markers
    return s.rstrip(end).strip(start)

Following implementation notes from Manzini, it is equivalent to use a simple null character suffix instead. The sorting should be done in colexicographic order (string read right-to-left), i.e. sorted(..., key=lambda s: s[::-1]) in Python. (The above control codes actually fail to satisfy EOF being the last character; the two codes are actually the first. The rotation holds nevertheless.)

== BWT applications ==
As a lossless compression algorithm the Burrows–Wheeler transform offers the important quality that its encoding is reversible and hence the original data may be recovered from the resulting compression. The lossless quality of Burrows algorithm has provided for different algorithms with different purposes in mind. To name a few, Burrows–Wheeler transform is used in algorithms for sequence alignment, image compression, data compression, etc. The following is a compilation of some uses given to the Burrows–Wheeler Transform.

=== BWT for sequence alignment ===
The advent of next-generation sequencing (NGS) techniques at the end of the 2000s decade has led to another application of the Burrows–Wheeler transformation. In NGS, DNA is fragmented into small pieces, of which the first few bases are sequenced, yielding several millions of "reads", each 30 to 500 base pairs ("DNA characters") long. In many experiments, e.g., in ChIP-Seq, the task is now to align these reads to a reference genome, i.e., to the known, nearly complete sequence of the organism in question (which may be up to several billion base pairs long). A number of alignment programs, specialized for this task, were published, which initially relied on hashing (e.g., Eland, SOAP, or Maq). In an effort to reduce the memory requirement for sequence alignment, several alignment programs were developed (Bowtie, BWA, and SOAP2) that use the Burrows–Wheeler transform.

=== BWT for image compression ===
The Burrows–Wheeler transformation has proved to be fundamental for image compression applications. For example, Showed a compression pipeline based on the application of the Burrows–Wheeler transformation followed by inversion, run-length, and arithmetic encoders. The pipeline developed in this case is known as Burrows–Wheeler transform with an inversion encoder (BWIC). The results shown by BWIC are shown to outperform the compression performance of well-known and widely used algorithms like Lossless JPEG and JPEG 2000. BWIC is shown to outperform those in terms of final compression size of radiography medical images on the order of 5.1% and 4.1% respectively. The improvements are achieved by combining BWIC and a pre-BWIC scan of the image in a vertical snake order fashion. More recently, additional works have shown the implementation of the Burrows–Wheeler Transform in conjunction with the known move-to-front transform (MTF) achieve near lossless compression of images.

=== BWT for compression of genomic databases ===
Cox et al. presented a genomic compression scheme that uses BWT as the algorithm applied during the first stage of compression of several genomic datasets including the human genomic information. Their work proposed that BWT compression could be enhanced by including a second stage compression mechanism called same-as-previous encoding ("SAP"), which makes use of the fact that suffixes of two or more prefix letters could be equal. With the compression mechanism BWT-SAP, Cox et al. showed that in the genomic database ERA015743, 135.5 GB in size, the compression scheme BWT-SAP compresses the ERA015743 dataset by around 94%, to 8.2 GB.

=== BWT for sequence prediction ===
BWT has also been proved to be useful on sequence prediction which is a common area of study in machine learning and natural-language processing. In particular, Ktistakis et al. proposed a sequence prediction scheme called SuBSeq that exploits the lossless compression of data of the Burrows–Wheeler transform. SuBSeq exploits BWT by extracting the FM-index and then performing a series of operations called backwardSearch, forwardSearch, neighbourExpansion, and getConsequents in order to search for predictions given a suffix. The predictions are then classified based on a weight and put into an array from which the element with the highest weight is given as the prediction from the SuBSeq algorithm.
