= Is Logic Empirical? =

"Is Logic Empirical?" is the title of two articles (one by Hilary Putnam and another by Michael Dummett) that discuss the idea that the algebraic properties of logic may, or should, be empirically determined; in particular, they deal with the question of whether empirical facts about quantum phenomena may provide grounds for revising classical logic as a consistent logical rendering of reality. The replacement derives from the work of Garrett Birkhoff and John von Neumann on quantum logic. In their work, they showed that the outcomes of quantum measurements can be represented as binary propositions and that these quantum mechanical propositions can be combined in a similar way as propositions in classical logic. However, the algebraic properties of this structure are somewhat different from those of classical propositional logic in that the principle of distributivity fails.

The idea that the principles of logic might be susceptible to revision on empirical grounds has many roots, including the work of W. V. Quine and the foundational studies of Hans Reichenbach.

== W. V. Quine ==
What is the epistemological status of the laws of logic? What sort of arguments are appropriate for criticising purported principles of logic? In his seminal paper "Two Dogmas of Empiricism," the logician and philosopher W. V. Quine argued that all beliefs are in principle subject to revision in the face of empirical data, including the so-called analytic propositions. Thus the laws of logic, being paradigmatic cases of analytic propositions, are not immune to revision.

To justify this claim he cited the so-called paradoxes of quantum mechanics. Birkhoff and von Neumann proposed to resolve those paradoxes by abandoning the principle of distributivity, thus substituting their quantum logic for classical logic.

Quine did not at first seriously pursue this argument, providing no sustained argument for the claim in that paper. In Philosophy of Logic (the chapter titled "Deviant Logics"), Quine rejects the idea that classical logic should be revised in response to the paradoxes, being concerned with "a serious loss of simplicity", and "the handicap of having to think within a deviant logic". Quine, though, stood by his claim that logic is in principle not immune to revision.

== Hans Reichenbach ==
Hans Reichenbach considered one of the anomalies associated with quantum mechanics, the problem of complementary properties. A pair of properties of a system is said to be complementary if each one of them can be assigned a truth value in some experimental setup, but there is no setup which assigns a truth value to both properties. The classic example of complementarity is illustrated by the double-slit experiment in which a photon can be made to exhibit particle-like properties or wave-like properties, depending on the experimental setup used to detect its presence. Another example of complementary properties is that of having a precisely observed position or momentum.

Reichenbach approached the problem within the philosophical program of the logical positivists, wherein the choice of an appropriate language was not a matter of the truth or falsity of a given language – in this case, the language used to describe quantum mechanics – but a matter of "technical advantages of language systems". His solution to the problem was a logic of properties with a three-valued semantics; each property could have one of three possible truth-values: true, false, or indeterminate. The formal properties of such a logical system can be given by a set of fairly simple rules, certainly far simpler than the "projection algebra" that Birkhoff and von Neumann had introduced a few years earlier.

== First article: Hilary Putnam ==
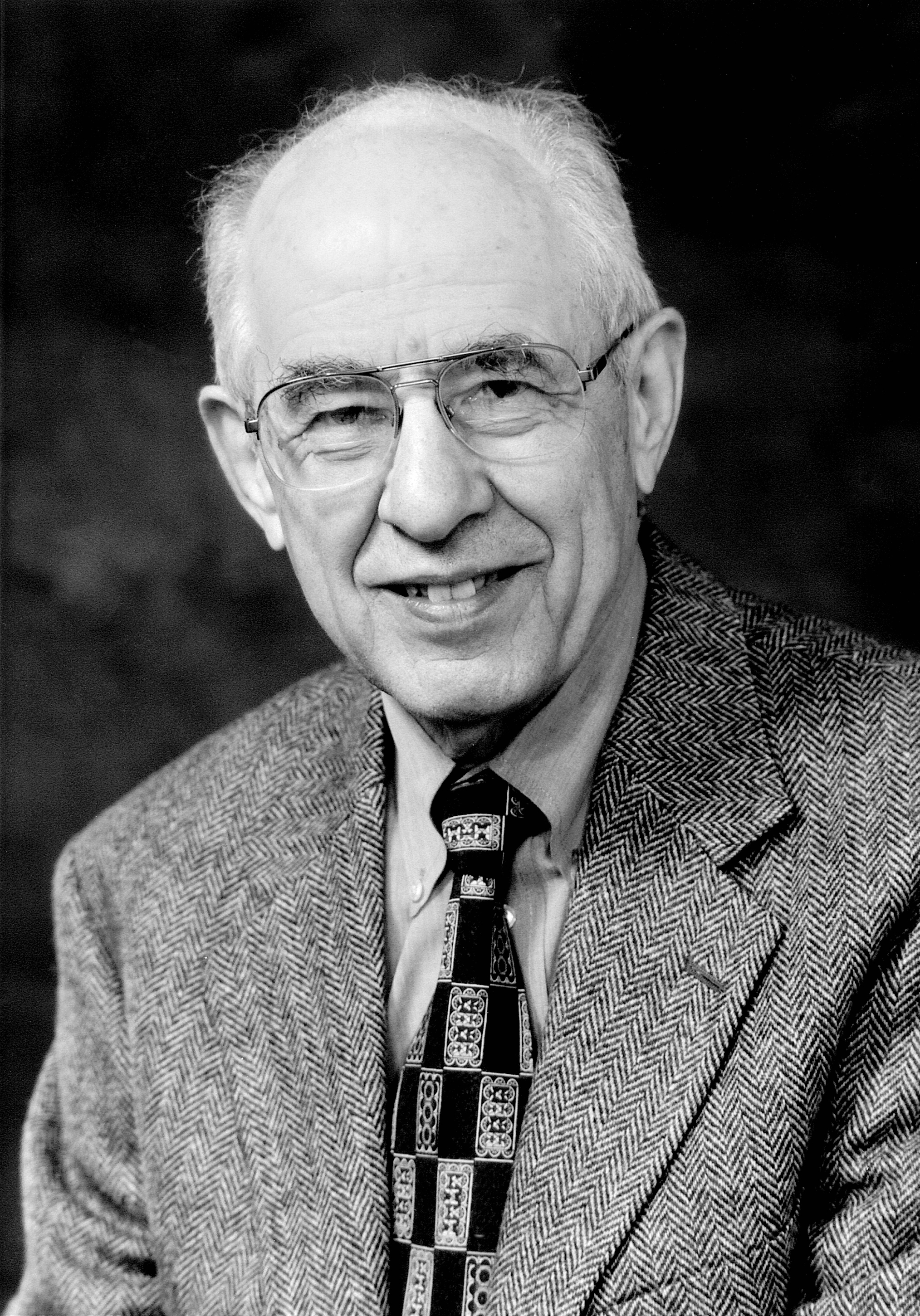
Hilary Putnam

In his paper "Is Logic Empirical?" Hilary Putnam, whose PhD studies were supervised by Reichenbach, pursued Quine's idea systematically. In the first place, he made an analogy between laws of logic and laws of geometry: at one time Euclid's postulates were believed to be truths about the physical space in which we live, but modern physical theories are based around non-Euclidean geometries, with a different and fundamentally incompatible notion of straight line.

In particular, he claimed that what physicists have learned about quantum mechanics provides a compelling case for abandoning certain familiar principles of classical logic for this reason: realism about the physical world, which Putnam generally maintains, demands that we square up to the anomalies associated with quantum phenomena. Putnam understands realism about physical objects to entail the existence of the properties of momentum and position for quanta. Since the uncertainty principle says that either of them can be determined, but both cannot be determined at the same time, he faces a paradox. He sees the only possible resolution of the paradox as lying in the embrace of quantum logic, which he believes is not inconsistent.

== Quantum logic ==
The formal laws of a physical theory are justified by a process of repeated controlled observations. This from a physicist's point of view is the meaning of the empirical nature of these laws.

The idea of a propositional logic with rules radically different from Boolean logic in itself was not new. Indeed a sort of analogy had been established in the mid-nineteen thirties by Garrett Birkhoff and John von Neumann between a non-classical propositional logic and some aspects of the measurement process in quantum mechanics. Putnam and the physicist David Finkelstein proposed that there was more to this correspondence than a loose analogy: that in fact there was a logical system whose semantics was given by a lattice of projection operators on a Hilbert space. This, actually, was the correct logic for reasoning about the microscopic world.

In this view, classical logic was merely a limiting case of this new logic. If this were the case, then our "preconceived" Boolean logic would have to be rejected by empirical evidence in the same way Euclidean geometry (taken as the correct geometry of physical space) was rejected on the basis of (the facts supporting the theory of) general relativity. This argument is in favor of the view that the rules of logic are empirical.

That logic came to be known as quantum logic. There are, however, few philosophers today who regard this logic as a replacement for classical logic; Putnam himself may not have held that view any longer at the end of his life. Quantum logic is still used as a foundational formalism for quantum mechanics: but in a way in which primitive events are not interpreted as atomic sentences but rather in operational terms as possible outcomes of observations. As such, quantum logic provides a unified and consistent mathematical theory of physical observables and quantum measurement.

== Second article: Michael Dummett ==
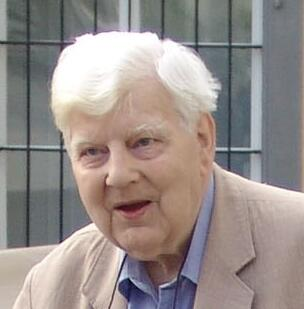
Michael Dummett

In an article also titled "Is Logic Empirical?," Michael Dummett argues that Putnam's desire for realism mandates distributivity: the principle of distributivity is essential for the realist's understanding of how propositions are true of the world, in just the same way as he argues the principle of bivalence is. To grasp why, consider why truth tables work for classical logic: first, it must be the case that the variable parts of the proposition are either true or false: if they could be other values, or fail to have truth values at all, then the truth table analysis of logical connectives would not exhaust the possible ways these could be applied. For example intuitionistic logic respects the classical truth tables, but not the laws of classical logic, because intuitionistic logic allows propositions to be other than true or false. Secondly, to be able to apply truth tables to describe a connective depends upon distributivity: a truth table is a disjunction of conjunctive possibilities, and the validity of the exercise depends upon the truth of the whole being a consequence of the bivalence of the propositions, which is true only if the principle of distributivity applies.

Hence Putnam cannot embrace realism without embracing classical logic, and hence his argument to endorse quantum logic because of realism about quanta is a hopeless case.

Dummett's argument is all the more interesting because he is not a proponent of classical logic. His argument for the connection between realism and classical logic is part of a wider argument to suggest that, just as the existence of particular class of entities may be a matter of dispute, so a disputation about the objective existence of such entities is also a matter of dispute. Consequently intuitionistic logic is privileged over classical logic, when it comes to disputation concerning phenomena whose objective existence is a matter of controversy.

Thus the question, "Is Logic Empirical?," for Dummett, leads naturally into the dispute over realism and anti-realism, one of the deepest issues in modern metaphysics.
