= Compressed suffix array =

Compressed data structure for pattern matching

In computer science, a compressed suffix array is a compressed data structure for pattern matching. Compressed suffix arrays are a general class of data structure that improve on the suffix array. These data structures enable quick search for an arbitrary string with a comparatively small index.

Given a text T of n characters from an alphabet Σ, a compressed suffix array supports searching for arbitrary patterns in T. For an input pattern P of m characters, the search time is typically O(m) or O(m + log(n)). The space used is typically $O(n H_k(T)) + o(n)$, where $H_k(T)$ is the k-th order empirical entropy of the text T. The time and space to construct a compressed suffix array are normally $O(n)$.

The original presentation of a compressed suffix array solved a long-standing open problem by showing that fast pattern matching was possible using only a linear-space data structure, namely, one proportional to the size of the text T, which takes $O(n \, {\log |\Sigma|})$ bits. The conventional suffix array and suffix tree use $\Omega(n \, {\log n})$ bits, which is substantially larger. The basis for the data structure is a recursive decomposition using the "neighbor function," which allows a suffix array to be represented by one of half its length. The construction is repeated multiple times until the resulting suffix array uses a linear number of bits. Following work showed that the actual storage space was related to the $0^{th}$-order entropy and that the index supports self-indexing. The space bound was further improved achieving the ultimate goal of higher-order entropy; the compression is obtained by partitioning the neighbor function by high-order contexts, and compressing each partition with a wavelet tree. The space usage is extremely competitive in practice with other state-of-the-art compressors, and it also supports fast in-situ pattern matching.

The memory accesses made by compressed suffix arrays and other compressed data structures for pattern matching are typically not localized, and thus these data structures have been notoriously hard to design efficiently for use in external memory. Recent progress using geometric duality takes advantage of the block access provided by disks to speed up the I/O time significantly In addition, potentially practical search performance for a compressed suffix array in external-memory has been demonstrated.

== Open source implementations ==
There are several open source implementations of compressed suffix arrays available (see External links below). Bowtie and Bowtie2 are open-source compressed suffix array implementations of read alignment for use in bioinformatics. The Succinct Data Structure Library (SDSL) is a library containing a variety of compressed data structures including compressed suffix arrays. FEMTO is an implementation of compressed suffix arrays for external memory. In addition, a variety of implementations, including the original FM-index implementations, are available from the Pizza & Chili Website (see external links).

== See also ==
- FM-index
- Suffix Array
