= Quantum logic =

Theory of logic to account for observations from quantum theory

In the mathematical study of logic and the physical analysis of quantum foundations, quantum logic is a set of rules for manipulation of propositions inspired by the structure of quantum theory. The formal system takes as its starting point an observation of Garrett Birkhoff and John von Neumann, that the structure of experimental tests in classical mechanics forms a Boolean algebra, but the structure of experimental tests in quantum mechanics forms a much more complicated structure.

A number of other logics have also been proposed to analyze quantum-mechanical phenomena, unfortunately also under the name of "quantum logic(s)". They are not the subject of this article. For discussion of the similarities and differences between quantum logic and some of these competitors, see § Relationship to other logics.

Quantum logic has been proposed as the correct logic for propositional inference generally, most notably by the philosopher Hilary Putnam, at least at one point in his career. This thesis was an important ingredient in Putnam's 1968 paper "Is Logic Empirical?" in which he analysed the epistemological status of the rules of propositional logic. Modern philosophers reject quantum logic as a basis for reasoning, because it lacks a material conditional; a common alternative is the system of linear logic, of which quantum logic is a fragment.

Mathematically, quantum logic is formulated by weakening the distributive law for a Boolean algebra, resulting in an orthocomplemented lattice. Quantum-mechanical observables and states can be defined in terms of functions on or to the lattice, giving an alternate formalism for quantum computations.

== Introduction ==
The most notable difference between quantum logic and classical logic is the failure of the propositional distributive law:

p and (q or r) = (p and q) or (p and r),

where the symbols p, q and r are propositional variables.

To illustrate why the distributive law fails, consider a particle moving on a line and (using some system of units where the reduced Planck constant is 1) let (Note: Due to technical reasons, it is not possible to represent these propositions as quantum-mechanical operators. They are presented here because they are simple enough to enable intuition, and can be considered as limiting cases of operators that are feasible. See § Quantum logic as the logic of observables et seq. for details.)

p = "the particle has momentum in the interval [0, +1/6]"
q = "the particle is in the interval [−1, 1]"
r = "the particle is in the interval [1, 3]"

We might observe that:

p and (q or r) = true

in other words, that the state of the particle is a weighted superposition of momenta between 0 and +1/6 and positions between −1 and +3.

On the other hand, the propositions "p and q" and "p and r" each assert tighter restrictions on simultaneous values of position and momentum than are allowed by the uncertainty principle (they each have uncertainty 1/3, which is less than the allowed minimum of 1/2). So there are no states that can support either proposition, and

(p and q) or (p and r) = false

== History and Philosophical Debate ==
In his classic 1932 treatise Mathematical Foundations of Quantum Mechanics, John von Neumann noted that projections on a Hilbert space can be viewed as propositions about physical observables; that is, as potential yes-or-no questions an observer might ask about the state of a physical system, questions that could be settled by some measurement. Principles for manipulating these quantum propositions were then called quantum logic by von Neumann and Birkhoff in a 1936 paper.

George Mackey, in his 1963 book (also called Mathematical Foundations of Quantum Mechanics), attempted to axiomatize quantum logic as the structure of an orthocomplemented lattice, and recognized that a physical observable could be defined in terms of quantum propositions. Although Mackey's presentation still assumed that the orthocomplemented lattice is the lattice of closed linear subspaces of a separable Hilbert space, Constantin Piron, Günther Ludwig and others later developed axiomatizations that do not assume an underlying Hilbert space.

Inspired by Hans Reichenbach's then-recent defence of general relativity, the philosopher Hilary Putnam popularized Mackey's work in two papers in 1968 and 1975, in which he attributed the idea that anomalies associated to quantum measurements originate with a failure of logic itself to his coauthor, physicist David Finkelstein. Putnam hoped to develop a possible alternative to hidden variables or wavefunction collapse in the problem of quantum measurement, but Gleason's theorem presents severe difficulties for this goal. Later, Putnam retracted his views, albeit with much less fanfare, but the damage had been done. While Birkhoff and von Neumann's original work only attempted to organize the calculations associated with the Copenhagen interpretation of quantum mechanics, a school of researchers had now sprung up, either hoping that quantum logic would provide a viable hidden-variable theory, or obviate the need for one. Their work proved fruitless, and now lies in poor repute.

Most philosophers would agree that quantum logic is not a competitor to classical logic. It is far from evident (albeit true) that quantum logic is a logic, in the sense of describing a process of reasoning, as opposed to a particularly convenient language to summarize the measurements performed by quantum apparatuses. In particular, some modern philosophers of science argue that quantum logic attempts to substitute metaphysical difficulties for unsolved problems in physics, rather than properly solving the physics problems. Tim Maudlin writes that quantum "logic 'solves' the [measurement] problem by making the problem impossible to state."

Quantum logic remains in use among logicians and interests are expanding through the recent development of quantum computing, which has engendered a proliferation of new logics for formal analysis of quantum protocols and algorithms (see also § Relationship to other logics). The logic may also find application in (computational) linguistics.

== Algebraic structure ==
Quantum logic can be axiomatized as the theory of propositions modulo the following identities:

- a = ¬¬a
- ∨ is commutative and associative.
- There is a maximal element ⊤, and ⊤ = b∨¬b for any b.
- a∨¬(¬a∨b) = a.

("¬" is the traditional notation for "not", "∨" the notation for "or", and "∧" the notation for "and".)

Some authors restrict to orthomodular lattices, which additionally satisfy the orthomodular law:

- If ⊤ = ¬(¬a∨¬b)∨¬(a∨b) then a = b.

("⊤" is the traditional notation for truth and ""⊥" the traditional notation for falsity.)

Alternative formulations include propositions derivable via a natural deduction, sequent calculus or tableaux system. Despite the relatively developed proof theory, quantum logic is not known to be decidable.

== Quantum logic as the logic of observables ==
The remainder of this article assumes the reader is familiar with the spectral theory of self-adjoint operators on a Hilbert space. However, the main ideas can be understood in the finite-dimensional case.

=== Logic of classical mechanics ===
The Hamiltonian formulations of classical mechanics have three ingredients: states, observables and dynamics. In the simplest case of a single particle moving in R^{3}, the state space is the position–momentum space R^{6}. An observable is some real-valued function f on the state space. Examples of observables are position, momentum or energy of a particle. For classical systems, the value f(x), that is the value of f for some particular system state x, is obtained by a process of measurement of f.

The propositions concerning a classical system are generated from basic statements of the form

"Measurement of f yields a value in the interval [a, b] for some real numbers a, b."

through the conventional arithmetic operations and pointwise limits. It follows easily from this characterization of propositions in classical systems that the corresponding logic is identical to the Boolean algebra of Borel subsets of the state space. They thus obey the laws of classical propositional logic (such as de Morgan's laws) with the set operations of union and intersection corresponding to the Boolean conjunctives and subset inclusion corresponding to material implication.

In fact, a stronger claim is true: they must obey the infinitary logic L_{ω_{1},ω}.

We summarize these remarks as follows: The proposition system of a classical system is a lattice with a distinguished orthocomplementation operation: The lattice operations of meet and join are respectively set intersection and set union. The orthocomplementation operation is set complement. Moreover, this lattice is sequentially complete, in the sense that any sequence {E_{i}}_{i∈N} of elements of the lattice has a least upper bound, specifically the set-theoretic union:
$$\operatorname{LUB}(\{E_i\}) = \bigcup_{i=1}^\infty E_i\text{.}$$

=== Propositional lattice of a quantum mechanical system ===
In the Hilbert space formulation of quantum mechanics as presented by von Neumann, a physical observable is represented by some (possibly unbounded) densely defined self-adjoint operator A on a Hilbert space H. A has a spectral decomposition, which is a projection-valued measure E defined on the Borel subsets of R. In particular, for any bounded Borel function f on R, the following extension of f to operators can be made:
$$f(A) = \int_{\mathbb{R}} f(\lambda) \, d \operatorname{E}(\lambda).$$

In case f is the indicator function of an interval [a, b], the operator f(A) is a self-adjoint projection onto the subspace of generalized eigenvectors of A with eigenvalue in [a,b]. That subspace can be interpreted as the quantum analogue of the classical proposition

- Measurement of A yields a value in the interval [a, b].

This suggests the following quantum mechanical replacement for the orthocomplemented lattice of propositions in classical mechanics, essentially Mackey's Axiom VII:

- The propositions of a quantum mechanical system correspond to the lattice of closed subspaces of H; the negation of a proposition V is the orthogonal complement V^{⊥}.

The space Q of quantum propositions is also sequentially complete: any pairwise-disjoint sequence {V_{i}}_{i} of elements of Q has a least upper bound. Here disjointness of W_{1} and W_{2} means W_{2} is a subspace of W_{1}^{⊥}. The least upper bound of {V_{i}}_{i} is the closed internal direct sum.

=== Standard semantics ===
The standard semantics of quantum logic is that quantum logic is the logic of projection operators in a separable Hilbert or pre-Hilbert space, where an observable p is associated with the set of quantum states for which p (when measured) has eigenvalue 1. From there,

- ¬p is the orthogonal complement of p (since for those states, the probability of observing p, P(p) = 0),
- p∧q is the intersection of p and q, and
- p∨q = ¬(¬p∧¬q) refers to states that superpose p and q.

This semantics has the nice property that the pre-Hilbert space is complete (i.e., Hilbert) if and only if the propositions satisfy the orthomodular law, a result known as the Solèr theorem. Although much of the development of quantum logic has been motivated by the standard semantics, it is not characterized by the latter; there are additional properties satisfied by that lattice that need not hold in quantum logic.

== Differences with classical logic ==
The structure of Q immediately points to a difference with the partial order structure of a classical proposition system. In the classical case, given a proposition p, the equations

⊤ = p∨q and
⊥ = p∧q

have exactly one solution, namely the set-theoretic complement of p. In the case of the lattice of projections there are infinitely many solutions to the above equations (any closed, algebraic complement of p solves it; it need not be the orthocomplement).

More generally, propositional valuation has unusual properties in quantum logic. An orthocomplemented lattice admitting a total lattice homomorphism to {⊥,⊤} must be Boolean. A standard workaround is to study maximal partial homomorphisms q with a filtering property:

if a≤b and q(a) = ⊤, then q(b) = ⊤.

=== Failure of distributivity ===
Expressions in quantum logic describe observables using a syntax that resembles classical logic. However, unlike classical logic, the distributive law a ∧ (b ∨ c) = (a ∧ b) ∨ (a ∧ c) fails when dealing with noncommuting observables, such as position and momentum. This occurs because measurement affects the system, and measurement of whether a disjunction holds does not measure which of the disjuncts is true.

For example, consider a simple one-dimensional particle with position denoted by x and momentum by p, and define observables:

- a — |p| ≤ 1 (in some units)
- b — x ≤ 0
- c — x ≥ 0

Now, position and momentum are Fourier transforms of each other, and the Fourier transform of a square-integrable nonzero function with a compact support is entire and hence does not have non-isolated zeroes. Therefore, there is no wave function that is both normalizable in momentum space and vanishes on precisely x ≥ 0. Thus, a ∧ b and similarly a ∧ c are false, so (a ∧ b) ∨ (a ∧ c) is false. However, a ∧ (b ∨ c) equals a, which is certainly not false (there are states for which it is a viable measurement outcome). Moreover: if the relevant Hilbert space for the particle's dynamics only admits momenta no greater than 1, then a is true.

To understand more, let p_{1} and p_{2} be the momentum functions (Fourier transforms) for the projections of the particle wave function to x ≤ 0 and x ≥ 0 respectively. Let |p_{i}|↾_{≥1} be the restriction of p_{i} to momenta that are (in absolute value) ≥1.

(a ∧ b) ∨ (a ∧ c) corresponds to states with |p_{1}|↾_{≥1} = |p_{2}|↾_{≥1} = 0 (this holds even if we defined p differently so as to make such states possible; also, a ∧ b corresponds to |p_{1}|↾_{≥1}=0 and p_{2}=0). Meanwhile, a corresponds to states with |p|↾_{≥1} = 0. As an operator, p = p_{1} + p_{2}, and nonzero |p_{1}|↾_{≥1} and |p_{2}|↾_{≥1} might interfere to produce zero |p|↾_{≥1}. Such interference is key to the richness of quantum logic and quantum mechanics.

== Relationship to quantum measurement ==
=== Mackey observables ===
Given a orthocomplemented lattice Q, a Mackey observable φ is a countably additive homomorphism from the orthocomplemented lattice of Borel subsets of R to Q. In symbols, this means that for any sequence {S_{i}}_{i} of pairwise-disjoint Borel subsets of R, {φ(S_{i})}_{i} are pairwise-orthogonal propositions (elements of Q) and

$$\varphi\left(\bigcup_{i=1}^\infty S_i\right) = \sum_{i=1}^\infty \varphi(S_i).$$

Equivalently, a Mackey observable is a projection-valued measure on R.

Theorem (Spectral theorem). If Q is the lattice of closed subspaces of Hilbert H, then there is a bijective correspondence between Mackey observables and densely defined self-adjoint operators on H.

=== Quantum probability measures ===
A quantum probability measure is a function P defined on Q with values in [0,1] such that P("⊥)=0, P(⊤)=1 and if {E_{i}}_{i} is a sequence of pairwise-orthogonal elements of Q then

$$\operatorname{P}\!\left(\bigvee_{i=1}^\infty E_i\right) = \sum_{i=1}^\infty \operatorname{P}(E_i).$$

Every quantum probability measure on the closed subspaces of a Hilbert space is induced by a density matrix — a nonnegative operator of trace 1. Formally,

Theorem. Suppose Q is the lattice of closed subspaces of a separable Hilbert space of complex dimension at least 3. Then for any quantum probability measure P on Q there exists a unique trace class operator S such that
$$\operatorname{P}(E) = \operatorname{Tr}(S E)$$
for any self-adjoint projection E in Q.

== Relationship to other logics ==
Quantum logic embeds into linear logic and the modal logic B. Indeed, modern logics for the analysis of quantum computation often begin with quantum logic, and attempt to graft desirable features of an extension of classical logic thereonto; the results then necessarily embed quantum logic.

The orthocomplemented lattice of any set of quantum propositions can be embedded into a Boolean algebra, which is then amenable to classical logic.

== Limitations ==
Although many treatments of quantum logic assume that the underlying lattice must be orthomodular, such logics cannot handle multiple interacting quantum systems. In an example due to Foulis and Randall, there are orthomodular propositions with finite-dimensional Hilbert models whose pairing admits no orthomodular model. Likewise, quantum logic with the orthomodular law falsifies the deduction theorem.

Quantum logic admits no reasonable material conditional; any connective that is monotone in a certain technical sense reduces the class of propositions to a Boolean algebra. Consequently, quantum logic struggles to represent the passage of time. One possible workaround is the theory of quantum filtrations developed in the late 1970s and 1980s by Belavkin. It is known, however, that System BV, a deep inference fragment of linear logic that is very close to quantum logic, can handle arbitrary discrete spacetimes.

== See also ==
- Fuzzy logic
- HPO formalism (An approach to temporal quantum logic)
- Linear logic
- Mathematical formulation of quantum mechanics
- Multi-valued logic
- Quantum Bayesianism
- Quantum cognition
- Quantum contextuality
- Quantum field theory
- Quantum probability
- Quasi-set theory
- Solèr's theorem
- Vector logic

== Sources ==
=== Historical works ===
Arranged chronologically

- J. von Neumann, Mathematical Foundations of Quantum Mechanics, trans. Robert T. Beyer, ed. Nicholas A. Wheeler; Princeton University Press, 2018 (original 1932). pp. 160-164. JSTOR j.ctt1wq8zhp. 1955 edition available at the Internet Archive.
- G. Birkhoff and J. von Neumann, "The Logic of Quantum Mechanics," Annals of Mathematics, series II, vol. 37, issue 4, pp. 823–843, 1936. JSTOR 1968621. DOI 10.2307/1968621.
- G. Mackey, Mathematical Foundations of Quantum Mechanics, W. A. Benjamin, 1963. HathiTrust 2027/mdp.39015001329567.
- H. Putnam, Is Logic Empirical?, Boston Studies in the Philosophy of Science V, ed. Robert S. Cohen and Marx W. Wartofsky, 1969.
- G. Kalmbach Orthomodular Logic, Z. Logik und Grundl. Math., vol. 20, 1974, pp. 395-406.
- G. Kalmbach Orthomodular Logic as a Hilbert Type Calculus, in Current Issues in Quantum Logic, Plenum Press, New York, ed. E. Beltrametti et al., 1981, pp. 333-340
- G. Kalmbach Orthomodular Lattices, Academic Press, London, 1983

=== Modern philosophical perspectives ===
- Guido Bacciagaluppi, "Is Logic Empirical?", in Handbook of Quantum Logic and Quantum Structures: Quantum Logic, ed. K. Engesser, D. M. Gabbay, and D. Lehmann; Elsevier, 2009. pp. 49-78.
- Tim Maudlin, "The Tale of Quantum Logic" in Hilary Putnam; Cambridge University Press "Contemporary Philosophy in Focus" series, 2005. DOI: 10.1017/CBO9780511614187.006 ISBN 9780521012546.
- de Ronde, C.; Domenech, G.; Freytes, H. "Quantum Logic in Historical and Philosophical Perspective". In Fieser, James; Dowden, Bradley (eds.). Internet Encyclopedia of Philosophy. ISSN 2161-0002. OCLC 37741658.
- Wilce, Alexander. "Quantum Logic and Probability Theory". In Zalta, Edward N. (ed.). Stanford Encyclopedia of Philosophy. ISSN 1095-5054. OCLC 429049174.

=== Mathematical study and computational applications ===
- A. Baltag and S. Smets, "LQP: The Dynamic Logic of Quantum Information", Mathematical Structures in Computer Science, vol. 16, issue 3, pp. 491-525, 2006. DOI 10.1017/S0960129506005299 arXiv 2110.01361
- A. Baltag, J. Bergfeld, K. Kishida, J. Sack, S. Smets and S. Zhong, "PLQP & Company: Decidable Logics for Quantum Algorithms", International Journal of Theoretical Physics, vol. 53, issue 10, pp. 3628-3647, 2014.
- M. L. Dalla Chiara and R. Giuntini, "Quantum Logics", in Handbook of Philosophical Logic, vol. 6, D. Gabbay and F. Guenthner (eds.), Kluwer, 2002. arXiv quant-ph/0101028
- M. L. Dalla Chiara, R. Giuntini, and R. Leporini, "Quantum Computational Logics: A Survey", in Trends in Logic, vol. 21, V. F. Hendricks and J. Malinowski (eds.), Springer, 2003. arXiv quant-ph/0305029
- Norman Megill, Quantum Logic Explorer at Metamath, 2019.
- N. Papanikolaou, "Reasoning Formally About Quantum Systems: An Overview", ACM SIGACT News, 36(3), 2005. pp. 51–66. arXiv cs/0508005.

=== Quantum foundations ===
- D. Cohen, An Introduction to Hilbert Space and Quantum Logic, Springer-Verlag, 1989. Elementary and well-illustrated; suitable for advanced undergraduates.
- Günther Ludwig, Der Grundlagen der Quantenmechanik (in German), Springer, 1954. The definitive work. Released in English as:
  - Günther Ludwig, Foundations of Quantum Mechanics, vol. 1, trans. Carl A. Hein; Springer-Verlag, 1983.
  - Günther Ludwig, An Axiomatic Basis for Quantum Mechanics, vol. 1: "Derivation of Hilbert Space Structure", trans. Leo F. Boron, ed. Karl Just; Springer, 1985. DOI: 10.1007/978-3-642-70029-3. ISBN 978-3-642-70029-3.
- Quantum Logic at the nLab
- C. Piron, Foundations of Quantum Physics, W. A. Benjamin, 1976.
