= Boyer–Moore =

Boyer–Moore may refer to:

- Boyer–Moore majority vote algorithm
- Boyer–Moore string-search algorithm
- Boyer–Moore–Horspool algorithm
- Boyer–Moore theorem prover
