= Horspool =

Horspool is a surname. Notable people with the surname include:

- David Horspool (born 1971), English historian and journalist
- Nigel Horspool, Canadian computer scientist
  - Boyer–Moore–Horspool algorithm
- Thomas Horspool (1830–?), British middle-distance runner
