= Raita (disambiguation) =

Raita is an Indian/Pakistani condiment based on yogurt.

Raita may also refer to:

== People with the surname ==
- Antti Raita (1883–1968) Finnish road racing cyclist
- Henna Raita, Finnish alpine skier
- Marjatta Raita, Finnish actress
- Mikko Raita, Finnish music mixing and recording engineer and producer

== People with the given name ==
- Raita Honjou (本庄雷太), Japanese artist
- Raita Ryū (竜 雷太; born 1940), Japanese actor
- Raita Suzuki (鈴木 雷太; born 1972), Japanese cyclist

== See also ==
- Raita Plot, one of the neighbourhoods of Shah Faisal Town in Karachi, Sindh, Pakistan
- Rhaita, a type of oboe used in Morocco
- Raita algorithm, a string-searching algorithm
- /r/AmItheAsshole, an advice forum on Reddit abbreviated to /r/AITA
