= Nigel Horspool =

British-Canadian computer scientist

R. Nigel Horspool is a retired professor of computer science, formerly of the University of Victoria. He invented the Boyer–Moore–Horspool algorithm, a fast string search algorithm adapted from the Boyer–Moore string-search algorithm. Horspool is co-inventor of dynamic Markov compression and was associate editor and then editor-at-large of the journal Software: Practice and Experience from 2007 to 2017. He is the author of C Programming in the Berkeley UNIX Environment.

Nigel Horspool is British by birth, but is now a citizen of Canada. After a public school education at Monmouth School, he studied at Pembroke College, Cambridge, where he received a BA in natural science, but specializing in theoretical physics, in 1969. After two years employment as an assembly language programmer on a partially successful air traffic control system project, he went to the University of Toronto for an MSc followed by a PhD in computer science. This was followed by seven years as an assistant professor and then an associate professor at McGill University. In 1983, he made a permanent move to the University of Victoria. As of July 2016, he retired from the university but retains the title of professor emeritus.
