= Matching wildcards =

Algorithm to compare text strings using wildcard syntax

In computer science, an algorithm for matching wildcards (also known as globbing) is useful in comparing text strings that may contain wildcard syntax. Common uses of these algorithms include command-line interfaces, e.g. the Bourne shell or Microsoft Windows command-line or text editor or file manager, as well as the interfaces for some search engines and databases. Wildcard matching is a subset of the problem of matching regular expressions and string matching in general.

== The problem ==
A wildcard matcher tests a wildcard pattern p against an input string s. It performs an anchored match; that is, it returns true only when p matches the entirety of s.

The pattern can be based on any common syntax (see globbing). However, on Windows, programmers tend to only discuss a simplified syntax supported by the native C runtime:

- No escape characters are defined
- Wildcards: ? matches exactly one occurrence of any character. * matches arbitrarily many (including zero) occurrences of any character.

This article mainly discusses the Windows formulation of the problem, unless otherwise stated.

=== Definition ===
Stated in zero-based indices, the wildcard-matching problem can be defined recursively as:
$$\begin{aligned}
m_{00} &= (p_{0} = t_{0}) \\
m_{0j} &= \text{false} \\
m_{i0} &= (p_{i-1} = \text{‘*’}) \land m_{i-1,0}\\
m_{ij} &=
\begin{cases}
m_{i-1, j-1}  & \text{for}\; p_{i-1} = t_{j-1} \lor p_{i-1} = \text{‘?’}\\
m_{i, j-1} \lor m_{i-1, j} & \text{for}\; p_{i-1} = \text{‘*’}\\
\text{false}  & \text{for}\; p_{i-1} \neq t_{j-1}
\end{cases} & & \quad  \text{for}\; 1 \leq i \le |p|, 1 \leq j \le |t|.
\end{aligned}$$

where m_{ij} is the result of matching the pattern p against the text t truncated at i and j characters respectively. This is the formulation used by Richter's algorithm and the Snippets algorithm found in Cantatore's collection. This description is similar to the Levenshtein distance.

=== Related problems ===
Directly related problems in computer science include:

- Pattern matching with don't cares or gaps, an unanchored string search with only the equivalent of ? defined.
- Pattern matching with wildcards, an unanchored string search with the equivalent of both wildcards defined. Has an exponential runtime unless a length-bound is given in the pattern matching with flexible wildcards variant.

== History ==
Early algorithms for matching wildcards often relied on recursion, but the technique was criticized on grounds of performance and reliability considerations. Non-recursive algorithms for matching wildcards have gained favor in light of these considerations.

Among both recursive and non-recursive algorithms, strategies for performing the pattern matching operation vary widely, as evidenced among the variety of example algorithms referenced below. Test case development and performance optimization techniques have been demonstrably brought to bear on certain algorithms, particularly those developed by critics of the recursive algorithms.

== Recursive algorithms ==
The recursion generally happens on matching * when there is more suffix to match against. This is a form of backtracking, also done by some regular expression matchers.

- Rich Salz' wildmat algorithm (sh-like syntax)
- Filip's algorithm and Vignesh Murugesan's algorithm
- Martin Richter's algorithm (identical to Snippets and related to the 7-zip algorithm)
- C library fnmatch implementations (supports [...] and multibyte character sets):
  - Guido van Rossum's BSD libc fnmatch, also part of Apple libc
  - Glibc fnmatch

The general form of these algorithms are the same. On recursion the algorithm slices the input into substrings, and considers a match to have happened when ONE of the substrings return a positive match. For dowild("*X", "abcX"), it would greedily call dowild("X", "abcX"), dowild("X", "bcX"), dowild("X", "cX") and dowild("X", "X"). They usually differ by less-important things like support for features and by more important factors such as minor but highly effective optimizations. Some of them include:

- The ABORT signal against over-recursion (Lars Mathiesen 1991). While it is correct to naively recurse by the entire rest of the strings (pattern and text) on * and making sure that ONE of the substrings return a positive match, the running time becomes exponential for rejecting a match with many * in the text. Lars Mathiesen changes the return to three classes, match, no-match, and ABORT (no match possible at all for asterisk recursion.) The ABORT value is returned when the text is consumed too early or when another asterisk match has failed, guaranteeing a linear performance with respect to the number of asterisks. (The overall complexity is additionally quadratic to the number of characters left to match.) Git/Rsync's wildmatch ABORT also covers invalid inputs. The new INN uwildmat does the same.
- Asterisk advancement in recursion. This wildmatch tweak is relatively more minor. It applies to when the recursion wants to match "*X" on "abcX": when an asterisk is followed by a literal like "X", it is obvious that only the last comparison with equal lengths would have a chance of producing a match. This is seen earlier in uwildmat in 2000 and more implicitly in van Rossum's fnmatch for FNM_PATHNAME.

Martin Richter's algorithm is an exception to this pattern, although the overall operation is equivalent. On * it recurses into increasing either of the indexes, following the dynamic programming formulation of the problem. The "ABORT" technique is applicable to it as well. On typical patterns (as tested by Cantatore) it is slower than the greedy-call implementations.

The recursive algorithms are in general easier to reason about, and with the ABORT modification they perform acceptably in terms of worst-case complexity. On strings without * they take linear-to-string-size time to match since there is a fixed one-to-one relation.

== Non-recursive algorithms ==
The following are developed by critics of the recursive algorithms:

- Kirk J. Krauss's wildcard-matching algorithm, used by IBM
- Alessandro Cantatore's collection of wildcard matching algorithms
- Dogan Kurt's iterative matcher and slower NFA matcher.
- Siler's incorrect algorithm (fails MATCH("da*da*da*", "daaadabadmanda"))

The following is not:

- Jack Handy's incorrect algorithm (fails MATCH("*?", "xx"))

The iterative functions above implement backtracking by saving an old set of pattern/text pointers, and reverting to it should a match fails. According to Kurt, since only one successful match is required, only one such set needs to be saved.

In addition, the problem of wildcard matching can be converted into regular expression matching using a naive text-replacement approach. Although non-recursive regular expression matchers such as Thompson's construction are less used in practice due to lack of backreference support, wildcard matching in general does not come with a similarly rich set of features. (In fact, many of the algorithms above only has support for ? and *.) The Russ Cox implementation of Thompson NFA can be trivially modified for such. Gustavo Navarro's BDM-based nrgrep algorithm provides a more streamlined implementation with emphasis on efficient suffixes. See also regular expression § Implementations.

== See also ==
- Pattern matching
- Pattern calculus
- Glob (programming)
- Wildcard character
- List of algorithms
