= Apostolico–Giancarlo algorithm =

Optimization of Boyer–Moore string-search algorithm

In computer science, the Apostolico–Giancarlo algorithm is a variant of the Boyer–Moore string-search algorithm, the basic application of which is searching for occurrences of a pattern P in a text T. As with other comparison-based string searches, this is done by aligning P to a certain index of T and checking whether a match occurs at that index. P is then shifted relative to T according to the rules of the Boyer–Moore algorithm, and the process repeats until the end of T has been reached. Application of the Boyer–Moore shift rules often results in large chunks of the text being skipped entirely.

With regard to the shift operation, Apostolico–Giancarlo is exactly equivalent in functionality to Boyer–Moore. The utility of Apostolico–Giancarlo is to speed up the match-checking operation at any index. With Boyer–Moore, finding an occurrence of P in T requires that all n characters of P be explicitly matched. For certain patterns and texts, this is very inefficient – a simple example is when both pattern and text consist of the same repeated character, in which case Boyer–Moore runs in O(nm), where m is the length in characters of T. Apostolico–Giancarlo speeds this up by recording the number of characters matched at the alignments of T in a table, which is combined with data gathered during the pre-processing of P to avoid redundant equality checking for sequences of characters that are known to match. It can be seen as a generalization of the Galil rule.
