= Symposium on Experimental Algorithms =

Computer science conference

The International Symposium on Experimental Algorithms (SEA), previously known as Workshop on Experimental Algorithms (WEA), is a computer science conference in the area of algorithm engineering.

== List ==
Past SEA editions
Edition	Proceedings	Location	Chairs
21st	SEA 2023	Barcelona, Spain	Loukas Georgiadis
20th	SEA 2022	Heidelberg, Germany	Christian Schulz
19th	SEA 2021	Nice, France	David Coudert, Emanuele Natale
18th	SEA 2020	Catania, Italy	Simone Faro, Domenico Cantone
17th	SEA 2018	L'Aquila, Italy	Gianlorenzo D'Angelo
16th	SEA 2017	London, UK	Costas S. Iliopoulos, Solon P. Pissis, Simon J. Puglisi, Rajeev Raman
15th	SEA 2016	St. Petersburg, Russia	Andrew V. Goldberg, Alexander S. Kulikov
14th	SEA 2015	Paris, France	Evripidis Bampis
13th	SEA 2014	Copenhagen, Denmark	Joachim Gudmundsson, Jyrki Katajainen
12th	SEA 2013	Rome, Italy	Vincenzo Bonifaci, Camil Demetrescu, Alberto Marchetti-Spaccamela
11th	SEA 2012	Bordeaux, France	Ralf Klasing
10th	SEA 2011	Kolimpari, Chania, Crete, Greece	Panos M. Pardalos, Steffen Rebennack
9th	SEA 2010	Ischia Island, Naples, Italy	Paola Festa
8th	SEA 2009	Dortmund, Germany	Jan Vahrenhold
7th	WEA 2008	Provincetown, MA, USA	Catherine C. McGeoch
6th	WEA 2007	Rome, Italy	Camil Demetrescu
5th	WEA 2006	Cala Galdana, Menorca Island, Spain	Carme Àlvarez, Maria J. Serna
4th	WEA 2005	Santorini Island, Greece	Sotiris E. Nikoletseas
3nd	WEA 2004	Angra dos Reis, Brazil	Celso C. Ribeiro, Simone L. Martins
2nd	WEA 2003	Ascona, Switzerland	Klaus Jansen, Marian Margraf, Monaldo Mastrolilli, José D. P. Rolim
