= Wildcard character =

Character used to substitute for any other character(s) in a string

In software, a wildcard character is a kind of placeholder represented by a single character, such as an asterisk (*), which can be interpreted as a number of literal characters or an empty string. It is often used in file searches so the full name need not be typed.

== Telecommunication ==
In telecommunications, a wildcard is a character that may be substituted for any of a defined subset of all possible characters.

- In high-frequency (HF) radio automatic link establishment, the wildcard character ? may be substituted for any one of the 36 upper-case alphanumeric characters.
- Whether the wildcard character represents a single character or a string of characters must be specified.

== Computing ==
In computer (software) technology, a wildcard is a symbol used to replace or represent zero or more characters. Algorithms for matching wildcards have been developed in a number of recursive and non-recursive varieties.

=== File and directory patterns ===
When specifying file names (or paths) in CP/M, Atari DOS, MS-DOS, Windows, and Unix-like operating systems, the asterisk character (*, also called "star") matches zero or more characters. For example, doc* matches doc and document but not dodo. If files are named with a date stamp, wildcards can be used to match date ranges, such as 202611*.mp4 to select video recordings from November 2026, to facilitate file operations such as copying and moving.

In Unix-like operating systems, MS-DOS, and Atari DOS, the question mark ? matches exactly one character. In MS-DOS, if the question mark is placed at the end of the word, it will also match missing (zero) trailing characters; for example, the pattern 123? will match 123 and 1234, but not 12345.

In Unix shells (Bourne shell, Bash, Zsh, fish, etc.) and PowerShell, ranges of characters enclosed in square brackets ([ and ]) match a single character within the set; for example, [A-Za-z] matches any single uppercase or lowercase letter. In Unix shells, a leading exclamation mark ! negates the set and matches only a character not within the list. In shells that interpret ! as a history substitution, a leading caret ^ can be used instead.

The operation of matching of wildcard patterns to multiple file or path names is referred to as globbing.

=== Databases ===
In SQL, wildcard characters can be used in LIKE expressions; the percent sign % matches zero or more characters, and underscore _ a single character. Transact-SQL also supports square brackets ([ and ]) to list sets and ranges of characters to match, a leading caret ^ negates the set and matches only a character not within the list. In Microsoft Access, the asterisk sign * matches zero or more characters, the question mark ? matches a single character, the number sign # matches a single digit (0–9), and square brackets can be used for sets or ranges of characters to match.

=== Regular expressions ===
In regular expressions, the period (., also called "dot") is the wildcard pattern which matches any single character. Followed by the Kleene star operator, which is denoted as an asterisk (*), we obtain .*, which will match zero or more arbitrary characters.

=== Search engines ===
The wildcard operator can be used in Google Search to fetch results which have one or more word(s) inserted between phrases; e.g. Googling "I love * so much" will populate results such as "I love this game so much", "I love my wife so much", etc.

=== Namespaces ===
In some languages, an asterisk can be used to qualify all symbols inside a namespace (sometimes called a "glob import" or "wildcard import"). For example, in Java import java.util.*; adds into scope all public classes from the java.util package, while in Rust use std::collections::*; adds into scope all public symbols from the std::collections module.

Some of the languages that use * as a glob token for importing items from a namespace include Java, Kotlin, Scala (since Scala 3), Rust, Python, and ECMAScript (JavaScript, TypeScript, etc.). In other languages, such as Scala 2 and earlier, as well as Herb Sutter's "Cpp2" (an alternative C++ syntax), _ is used as the glob token.

=== Generic types ===
In some languages, a type parameter may be a wildcard, which is used to control type safety of a type parameter in a generic type.

- In Java, this is represented by the character ? (for example List<?>),
- In Kotlin, this is represented by the character * (for example List<*>).
- In Scala, this is represented by the character ? since Scala 3 (for example List[?]); in Scala 2, the character _ was used to represent the type wildcard (for example List[_]).

In Rust, a generic type parameter can be left unspecified for the compiler to interpret using _, called an "inferred type" (for example Vec<_>).

== See also ==
- Pattern matching – Functional programming construct
- Query by Example – Database query language
- Wild card (cards) – Card which may stand in for a card of another value
- Wildcard DNS record – Type of domain name record
- wildmat – Pattern matching library developed by Rich Salz
