= Pattern calculus =

Pattern calculus bases all computation on pattern matching of a very general kind. Like lambda calculus, it supports a uniform treatment of function evaluation. Also, it allows functions to be passed as arguments and returned as results. In addition, pattern calculus supports uniform access to the internal structure of arguments, be they pairs or lists or trees. Also, it allows patterns to be passed as arguments and returned as results. Uniform access is illustrated by a pattern-matching function size that computes the size of an arbitrary data structure. In the notation of the programming language bondi, it is given by the recursive function

let rec size = 
 | x y -> (size x) + (size y) 
 | x -> 1

The second, or default case x -> 1 matches the pattern x against the argument and returns 1. This case is used only if the matching failed in the first case. The first, or special case matches against any compound, such as a non-empty list, or pair. Matching binds x to the left component and y to the right component. Then the body of the case adds the sizes of these components together.

Similar techniques yield generic queries for searching and updating. Combining recursion and decomposition in this way yields path polymorphism.

The ability to pass patterns as parameters (pattern polymorphism) is illustrated by defining a generic eliminator. Suppose given constructors Leaf for creating the leaves of a tree, and Count for converting numbers into counters. The corresponding eliminators are then

elimLeaf  = |  Leaf y -> y 
elimCount = | Count y -> y

For example, elimLeaf (Leaf 3) evaluates to 3 as does elimCount (Count 3).

These examples can be produced by applying the generic eliminator elim to the constructors in question. It is defined by

elim = | x -> | {y} x y -> y

Now elim Leaf evaluates to | {y} Leaf y -> y which is equivalent to elimLeaf. Also elim Count is equivalent to elimCount.

In general, the curly braces {} contain the bound variables of the pattern, so that x is free and y is bound in | {y} x y -> y.
