= String-searching algorithm =

Searching for patterns in text

A string-searching algorithm, sometimes called string-matching algorithm, is an algorithm that searches a body of text for portions that match by pattern.

A basic example of string searching is when the pattern and the searched text are arrays of elements of an alphabet (finite set) Σ. Σ may be a human language alphabet, for example, the letters A through Z and other applications may use a binary alphabet (Σ = {0,1}) or a DNA alphabet (Σ = {A,C,G,T}) in bioinformatics.

In practice, the method of feasible string-search algorithm may be affected by the string encoding. In particular, if a variable-width encoding is in use, then it may be slower to find the Nth character, perhaps requiring time proportional to N. This may significantly slow some search algorithms. One of many possible solutions is to search for the sequence of code units instead, but doing so may produce false matches unless the encoding is specifically designed to avoid it.

== Overview ==
The most basic case of string searching involves one (often very long) string, sometimes called the haystack, and one (often very short) string, sometimes called the needle. The goal is to find one or more occurrences of the needle within the haystack. For example, one might search for to within:

Some books are to be tasted, others to be swallowed, and some few to be chewed and digested.

One might request the first occurrence of "to", which is the fourth word; or all occurrences, of which there are 3; or the last, which is the fifth word from the end.

Very commonly, however, various constraints are added. For example, one might want to match the "needle" only where it consists of one (or more) complete words—perhaps defined as not having other letters immediately adjacent on either side. In that case a search for "hew" or "low" should fail for the example sentence above, even though those literal strings do occur.

Another common example involves "normalization". For many purposes, a search for a phrase such as "to be" should succeed even in places where there is something else intervening between the "to" and the "be":

- More than one space
- Other "whitespace" characters such as tabs, non-breaking spaces, line-breaks, etc.
- Less commonly, a hyphen or soft hyphen
- In structured texts, tags or even arbitrarily large but "parenthetical" things such as footnotes, list-numbers or other markers, embedded images, and so on.

Many symbol systems include characters that are synonymous (at least for some purposes):

- Latin-based alphabets distinguish lower-case from upper-case, but for many purposes string search is expected to ignore the distinction.
- Many languages include ligatures, where one composite character is equivalent to two or more other characters.
- Many writing systems involve diacritical marks such as accents or vowel points, which may vary in their usage, or be of varying importance in matching.
- DNA sequences can involve non-coding segments which may be ignored for some purposes, or polymorphisms that lead to no change in the encoded proteins, which may not count as a true difference for some other purposes.
- Some languages have rules where a different character or form of character must be used at the start, middle, or end of words.

Finally, for strings that represent natural language, aspects of the language itself become involved. For example, one might wish to find all occurrences of a "word" despite it having alternate spellings, prefixes or suffixes, etc.

Another more complex type of search is regular expression searching, where the user constructs a pattern of characters or other symbols, and any match to the pattern should fulfill the search. For example, to catch both the American English word "color" and the British equivalent "colour", instead of searching for two different literal strings, one might use a regular expression such as:

colou?r

where the "?" conventionally makes the preceding character ("u") optional.

This article mainly discusses algorithms for the simpler kinds of string searching.

A similar problem introduced in the field of bioinformatics and genomics is the maximal exact matching (MEM). Given two strings, MEMs are common substrings that cannot be extended left or right without causing a mismatch.

== Examples of search algorithms ==
=== Naive string search ===
A simple and inefficient way to see where one string occurs inside another is to check at each index, one by one. First, we see if there is a copy of the needle starting at the first character of the haystack; if not, we look to see if there's a copy of the needle starting at the second character of the haystack, and so forth. In the normal case, we only have to look at one or two characters for each wrong position to see that it is a wrong position, so in the average case, this takes O(n + m) steps, where n is the length of the haystack and m is the length of the needle; but in the worst case, searching for a string like "aaaab" in a string like "aaaaaaaaab", it takes O(nm)

=== Finite-state-automaton-based search ===

In this approach, backtracking is avoided by constructing a deterministic finite automaton (DFA) that recognizes a stored search string. These are expensive to construct—they are usually created using the powerset construction—but are very quick to use. For example, the DFA shown to the right recognizes the word "MOMMY". This approach is frequently generalized in practice to search for arbitrary regular expressions.

=== Stubs ===
Knuth–Morris–Pratt computes a DFA that recognizes inputs with the string to search for as a suffix, Boyer–Moore starts searching from the end of the needle, so it can usually jump ahead a whole needle-length at each step. Baeza–Yates keeps track of whether the previous j characters were a prefix of the search string, and is therefore adaptable to fuzzy string searching. The bitap algorithm is an application of Baeza–Yates' approach.

=== Index methods ===
Faster search algorithms preprocess the text. After building a substring index, for example a suffix tree or suffix array, the occurrences of a pattern can be found quickly. As an example, a suffix tree can be built in $\Theta(n)$ time, and all $z$ occurrences of a pattern can be found in $O(m)$ time under the assumption that the alphabet has a constant size and all inner nodes in the suffix tree know what leaves are underneath them. The latter can be accomplished by running a DFS algorithm from the root of the suffix tree.

=== Other variants ===
Some search methods, for instance trigram search, are intended to find a "closeness" score between the search string and the text rather than a "match/non-match". These are sometimes called "fuzzy" searches.

== Classification of search algorithms ==
=== Classification by a number of patterns ===
The various algorithms can be classified by the number of patterns each uses.

==== Single-pattern algorithms ====
In the following compilation, m is the length of the pattern, n the length of the searchable text, and k = |Σ| is the size of the alphabet.

Algorithm	Preprocessing time	Matching time (Note: Asymptotic times are expressed using O, Ω, and Θ notation.)	Space
Naïve algorithm	none	Θ(n+m) in average, O(mn) at worst	none
Automaton-based matching	Θ(km)	Θ(n)	Θ(km)
Rabin–Karp	Θ(m)	Θ(n) in average, O(mn) at worst	O(1)
Knuth–Morris–Pratt	Θ(m)	Θ(n)	Θ(m)
Boyer–Moore	Θ(m + k)	O(n/m) at best, O(mn) at worst	Θ(k)
Two-way algorithm (Note: Used to implement the memmem and strstr search functions in the glibc and musl C standard libraries.)	Θ(m)	O(n)	O(log(m))
Backward Non-Deterministic DAWG Matching (BNDM) (Note: Can be extended to handle approximate string matching and (potentially-infinite) sets of patterns represented as regular languages.)	O(m)	Ω(n/m) at best, O(mn) at worst	
Backward Oracle Matching (BOM)	O(m)	O(mn)	

The Boyer–Moore string-search algorithm has been the standard benchmark for the practical string-search literature.

==== Algorithms using a finite set of patterns ====
In the following compilation, M is the length of the longest pattern, m their total length, n the length of the searchable text, o the number of occurrences.

Algorithm	Extension of	Preprocessing time	Matching time	Space
Aho–Corasick	Knuth–Morris–Pratt	Θ(m)	Θ(n + o)	Θ(m)
Commentz-Walter	Boyer-Moore	Θ(m)	Θ(M * n) worst case sublinear in average	Θ(m)
Set-BOM	Backward Oracle Matching			

==== Algorithms using an infinite number of patterns ====
Naturally, the patterns can not be enumerated finitely in this case. They are represented usually by a regular grammar or regular expression.

=== Classification by the use of preprocessing programs ===
Other classification approaches are possible. One of the most common uses preprocessing as main criteria.

Classes of string searching algorithms
	Text not preprocessed	Text preprocessed
Patterns not preprocessed	Elementary algorithms	Index methods
Patterns preprocessed	Constructed search engines	Signature methods

=== Classification by matching strategies ===
Another one classifies the algorithms by their matching strategy:

- Match the prefix first (Knuth–Morris–Pratt, Shift-And, Aho–Corasick)
- Match the suffix first (Boyer–Moore and variants, Commentz-Walter)
- Match the best factor first (BNDM, BOM, Set-BOM)
- Other strategy (Naïve, Rabin–Karp, Vectorized)

=== Real-time string matching ===
In real-time string matching, one requires the matcher to output a response after reading each character of the text, that indicates whether this is the last character of a match. The response has to be given within constant time. The requirement regarding preprocessing vary: O(m) preprocessing may be allowed after the pattern is read (but before the reading of the text), or a stricter requirement may be posed according to which the matcher has to also pause for at most a constant time after reading any character of the pattern (including the last). For the more lenient version, if one does not mind that the preprocessing time and memory requirement dependend on the size of the alphabet, a real-time solution is provided by automaton matching. Zvi Galil developed a method to turn certain algorithms into real-time algorithms, and applied it to produce a variant of the KMP matcher that runs in real time under the strict requirement.

== String searching with don't cares ==
In this version of the string searching problem, there is a special symbol, ø (read: don't care), which can match any other symbol (including another ø). Don't care symbols can appear either in the pattern or in the text. In 2002, an algorithm for this problem that runs in $O(n\log m)$ time has been given by Richard Cole and Ramesh Hariharan, improving on a solution from 1973 by Fischer and Paterson that has complexity $O(n\log m\log k)$, where k is the size of the alphabet. Another algorithm, claimed simpler, has been proposed by Clifford and Clifford.

== See also ==
- Sequence alignment
- Graph matching
- Pattern matching
- Compressed pattern matching
- Matching wildcards
- Approximate string matching
- Full-text search
- Two-dimensional pattern matching
