= Factor oracle =

A factor oracle is a finite-state automaton that can efficiently search for factors (substrings) in a body of text. Older techniques, such as suffix trees, were time-efficient but required significant amounts of memory. Factor oracles, by contrast, can be constructed in linear time and space in an incremental fashion.

== Overview ==
Older techniques for matching strings include: suffix arrays, suffix trees, suffix automata or directed acyclic word graphs, and factor automata (Allauzen, Crochemore, Raffinot, 1999). In 1999, Allauzen, Crochemore, and Raffinot, presented the factor oracle algorithm as a memory efficient improvement upon these older techniques for string matching and compression. Starting in the mid-2000s, factor oracles have found application in computer music, as well.

== Implementations ==
The Computer Audition Laboratory provides a Matlab implementation of the factor oracle algorithm.

== See also ==
- Suffix array
- Generalised suffix tree
