= Ukkonen =

Ukkonen is a Finnish surname. Tte word literally means "thunderstorm". Notable people with the surname include:

- Esko Ukkonen (born 1950), Finnish theoretical computer scientist
- Kari Ukkonen (born 1961), Finnish footballer and manager

== See also ==
- Ukko
