= Generalized suffix tree =

Suffix tree for the strings ABAB and BABA. Suffix links not shown.

In computer science, a generalized suffix tree is a suffix tree for a set of strings. Given the set of strings $D=S_1,S_2,\dots,S_d$ of total length $n$, it is a Patricia tree containing all $n$ suffixes of the strings. It is mostly used in bioinformatics.

== Functionality ==
It can be built in $\Theta(n)$ time and space, and can be used to find all z occurrences of a string P of length m in $O(m + z)$ time, which is asymptotically optimal (assuming the size of the alphabet is constant).

When constructing such a tree, each string should be padded with a unique out-of-alphabet marker symbol (or string) to ensure no suffix is a substring of another, guaranteeing each suffix is represented by a unique leaf node.

Algorithms for constructing a GST include Ukkonen's algorithm (1995) and McCreight's algorithm (1976).

== Example ==
A suffix tree for the strings ABAB and BABA is shown in a figure above. They are padded with the unique terminator strings $0 and $1. The numbers in the leaf nodes are string number and starting position. Notice how a left to right traversal of the leaf nodes corresponds to the sorted order of the suffixes. The terminators might be strings or unique single symbols. Edges on $ from the root are left out in this example.

== Alternatives ==
An alternative to building a generalized suffix tree is to concatenate the strings, and build a regular suffix tree or suffix array for the resulting string. When hits are evaluated after a search, global positions are mapped into documents and local positions with some algorithm and/or data structure, such as a binary search in the starting/ending positions of the documents.
