= Heikki Mannila =

Finnish computer scientist

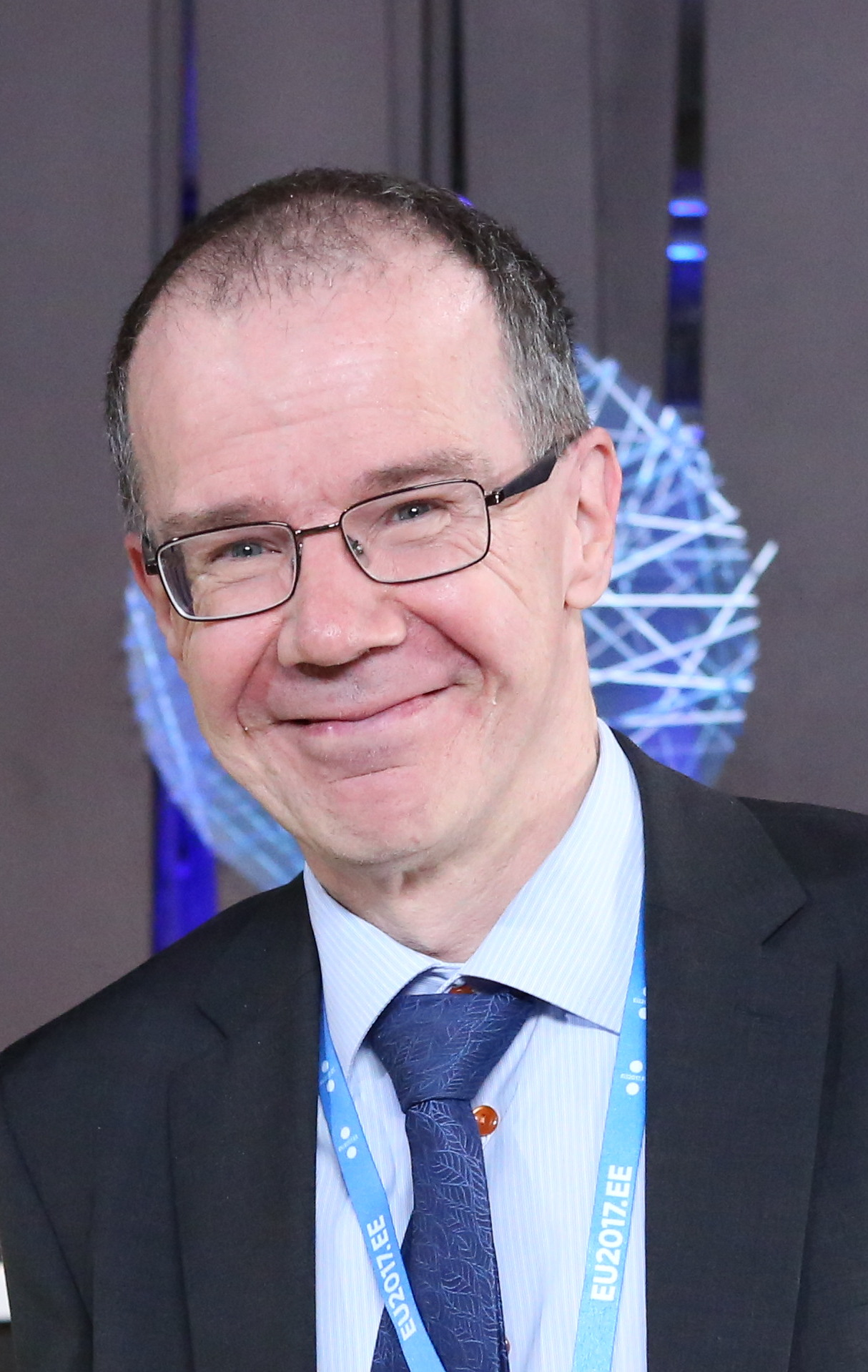
- Heikki Mannila in 2017
- Born: Heikki Olavi Mannila; January 4, 1960 (age 66); Espoo, Finland
- Education: University of Helsinki (PhD)
- Known for: Association rule learning Sequence mining Principles of Data Mining
- Scientific career
- Fields: Computer science, data mining
- Workplaces: University of Helsinki; Academy of Finland; Aalto University
- Thesis: (1985)
- Doctoral advisor: Esko Ukkonen

Heikki Olavi Mannila (born 4 January 1960 in Espoo) is a Finnish computer scientist, the president of the Academy of Finland.

Mannila earned his Ph.D. in 1985 from the University of Helsinki under the supervision of Esko Ukkonen and for many years he was a professor at the University of Helsinki himself. From 2004 to 2008 he was Academy Professor at the Academy of Finland. He became Vice President for Academic Affairs at Aalto University in 2009, and was appointed by the Finnish government as president of the Academy of Finland for a term lasting from 2012 to 2017. The appointment was renewed for the period 2017–2022.

Mannila is known for his research in data mining, and has published highly cited papers on association rule learning and sequence mining. With David Hand and Padhraic Smyth, he is the co-author of the book Principles of Data Mining (MIT Press, 2001).

Heikki Mannila is son to the professor Elina Haavio-Mannila.
