= Esko Ukkonen =

Finnish theoretical computer scientist (born 1950)

- Born: January 26, 1950 (age 76); Savonlinna, Finland
- Citizenship: Finland
- Education: University of Helsinki
- Known for: Ukkonen's algorithm
- Scientific career
- Fields: String algorithms
- Workplaces: University of Helsinki
- Doctoral advisor: Martti Tienari
- Doctoral students: Heikki Mannila

Esko Juhani Ukkonen (born 1950) is a Finnish theoretical computer scientist known for his contributions to string algorithms, and particularly for Ukkonen's algorithm for suffix tree construction. He is a professor emeritus of the University of Helsinki.

== Biography ==
Ukkonen earned his PhD from the University of Helsinki in 1978, where he has been a full professor since 1985. He was the head of the computer science department at the University of Helsinki in 1998–1999 and in 2010–2013, and an academy professor of the Academy of Finland in 1999–2004. He is the editor-in-chief of the Nordic Journal of Computing since 1993.

Ukkonen is a First Class Knight of the Order of the White Rose of Finland (2000). He is a member of Finnish Academy of Science and Letters since 2000, and a foreign member of Estonian Academy of Sciences. A festschrift in his honour was published by Springer in the Lecture Notes in Computer Science book series. He holds an honorary doctorate from Aalto University (2014).
