= Maximal pair =

In computer science, a maximal pair within a string is a pair of matching substrings that are maximal, where "maximal" means that it is not possible to make a longer matching pair by extending the range of both substrings to the left or right.

== Example ==
| Index | 1 | 2 | 3 | 4 | 5 | 6 | 7 | 8 | 9 | 10 | 11 | 12 | 13 | 14 |
| Character | x | a | b | c | y | a | b | c | w | a | b | c | y | z |

For example, in this table, the substrings at indices 2 to 4 (in red) and indices 6 to 8 (in blue) are a maximal pair, because they contain identical characters (abc), and they have different characters to the left (x at index 1 and y at index 5) and different characters to the right (y at index 5 and w at index 9). Similarly, the substrings at indices 6 to 8 (in blue) and indices 10 to 12 (in green) are a maximal pair.

However, the substrings at indices 2 to 4 (in red) and indices 10 to 12 (in green) are not a maximal pair, as the character y follows both substrings, and so they can be extended to the right to make a longer pair.

== Formal definition ==
Formally, a maximal pair of substrings with starting positions $p_1$ and $p_2$ respectively, and both of length $l$, is specified by a triple $(p_1, p_2, l)$, such that, given a string $S$ of length $n$, $S[p_1..p_1+l-1]=S[p_2..p_2+l-1]$ (meaning that the substrings have identical contents), but $S[p_1-1] \neq S[p_2-1]$ (they have different characters to their left) and $S[p_1+l] \neq S[p_2+l]$ (they also have different characters to their right; together, these two inequalities are the condition for being maximal). Thus, in the example above, the maximal pairs are $(2,6,3)$ (the red and blue substrings) and $(6,10,3)$ (the green and blue substrings), and $(2,10,3)$ is not a maximal pair.

== Related concepts and time complexity ==
A maximal repeat is the string represented by a maximal pair. A supermaximal repeat is a maximal repeat never occurring as a proper substring of another maximal repeat. In the above example, abc and abcy are both maximal repeats, but only abcy is a supermaximal repeat.

Maximal pairs, maximal repeats and supermaximal repeats can each be found in $\Theta(n+z)$ time using a suffix tree, if there are $z$ such structures.
