= Substring =

Contiguous part of a sequence of symbols

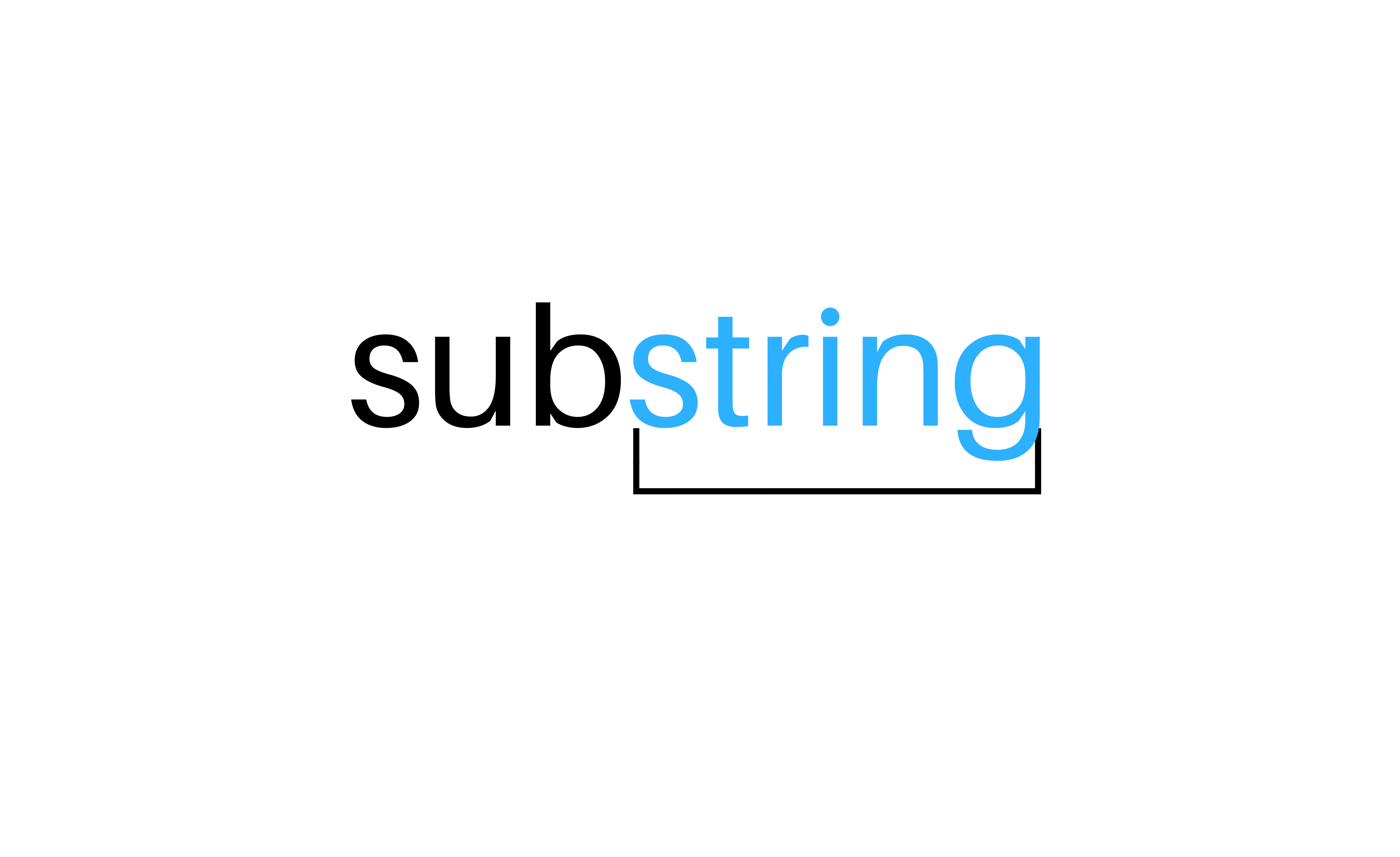
"string" is a substring of "substring"

In formal language theory and computer science, a substring is a contiguous sequence of characters within a string. For instance, "the best of" is a substring of "It was the best of times". In contrast, "Itwastimes" is a subsequence of "It was the best of times", but not a substring.

Prefixes and suffixes are special cases of substrings. A prefix of a string $S$ is a substring of $S$ that occurs at the beginning of $S$; likewise, a suffix of a string $S$ is a substring that occurs at the end of $S$.

The substrings of the string "apple" would be: "a", "ap", "app", "appl", "apple", "p", "pp", "ppl", "pple", "pl", "ple", "l", "le" "e", "" (note the empty string at the end).

== Substring ==
A string $u$ is a substring (or factor) of a string $t$ if there exists two strings $p$ and $s$ such that $t = pus$. In particular, the empty string is a substring of every string.

Example: The string $u=\texttt{ana}$ is equal to substrings (and subsequences) of $t=\texttt{banana}$ at two different offsets:

banana
 |||||
 ana||
   |||
   ana

The first occurrence is obtained with $p=\texttt{b}$ and $s=\texttt{na}$, while the second occurrence is obtained with $p=\texttt{ban}$ and $s$ being the empty string.

A substring of a string is a prefix of a suffix of the string, and equivalently a suffix of a prefix; for example, nan is a prefix of nana, which is in turn a suffix of banana. If $u$ is a substring of $t$, it is also a subsequence, which is a more general concept. The occurrences of a given pattern in a given string can be found with a string searching algorithm. Finding the longest string which is equal to a substring of two or more strings is known as the longest common substring problem. In the mathematical literature, substrings are also called subwords (in America) or factors (in Europe).

== Prefix ==
A string $p$ is a prefix of a string $t$ if there exists a string $s$ such that $t = ps$. A proper prefix of a string is not equal to the string itself; some sources in addition restrict a proper prefix to be non-empty. A prefix can be seen as a special case of a substring.

Example: The string ban is equal to a prefix (and substring and subsequence) of the string banana:

banana
|||
ban

The square subset symbol is sometimes used to indicate a prefix, so that $p \sqsubseteq t$ denotes that $p$ is a prefix of $t$. This defines a binary relation on strings, called the prefix relation, which is a particular kind of prefix order.

== Suffix ==
A string $s$ is a suffix of a string $t$ if there exists a string $p$ such that $t = ps$. A proper suffix of a string is not equal to the string itself. A more restricted interpretation is that it is also not empty. A suffix can be seen as a special case of a substring.

Example: The string nana is equal to a suffix (and substring and subsequence) of the string banana:

banana
  ||||
  nana

A suffix tree for a string is a trie data structure that represents all of its suffixes. Suffix trees have large numbers of applications in string algorithms. The suffix array is a simplified version of this data structure that lists the start positions of the suffixes in alphabetically sorted order; it has many of the same applications.

== Border ==
A border is suffix and prefix of the same string, e.g. "$\texttt{bab}$" is a border of "$\texttt{babab}$" (and also of "$\texttt{baboon}\,\,\texttt{eating}\,\,\texttt{a}\,\,\texttt{kebab}$").

== Superstring ==
A superstring of a finite set $P$ of strings is a single string that contains every string in $P$ as a substring. For example, $\texttt{bcclabccefab}$ is a superstring of $P = \{\texttt{abcc}, \texttt{efab}, \texttt{bccla}\}$, and $\texttt{efabccla}$ is a shorter one. Concatenating all members of $P$, in arbitrary order, always obtains a trivial superstring of $P$. Finding superstrings whose length is as small as possible is a more interesting problem, see Shortest common superstring.

A string that contains every possible permutation of a specified character set is called a superpermutation.

== See also ==
- Substring index
- Suffix automaton
