= Defective distribution =

Defective distribution is the situation where a phoneme in a certain language does not occur in all contexts.

== Examples ==
In German, the phoneme /h/ only occurs at the beginning and in the middle of a word, but not at the end.

In Italian, the phoneme /z/ does not occur morpheme- or word–initially.

== See also ==
- Contrastive distribution
- Complementary distribution
