= James W. Hunt =

American computer scientist and inventor (1952–2021)

James W. Hunt Computer Scientist and Inventor
- Born: August 5, 1952; Trenton, NJ
- Died: March 21, 2021 (aged 68)
- Resting place: Ewing Cemetery, Ewing, NJ
- Education: B.S. Electrical Engineering, Princeton University; M.S. Electrical Engineering, Stanford University; Ph.D. Electrical Engineering, Stanford University
- Alma mater: Princeton University; Stanford University
- Employer: Bell Labs
- Notable work: Hunt–Szymanski algorithm

James Wayne Hunt (August 5, 1952 – March 21, 2021) was an African-American computer scientist and inventor. He invented the Hunt–Szymanski algorithm and Hunt–McIlroy algorithm algorithms. It was one of the first non-heuristic algorithms used in diff. To this day, variations of this algorithm are found in incremental version control systems, wiki engines, and molecular phylogenetics research software. The research accompanying the final version of Unix diff, written by Douglas McIlroy, was published in the 1976 paper "An Algorithm for Differential File Comparison", co-written with James W. Hunt, who developed an initial prototype of diff.

== Early life and education ==
Wayne was the first born of two to the union of Augustus and Bernyce Hunt on August 5, 1952 in Trenton, NJ. He grew up as a major lover of jazz, funk, and R&B music as well as photography, his quiet and quick witted personality charmed most everyone he met. He graduated cum laude with a B.S. in electrical engineering from Princeton University, and then went on to receive both his M.S. and PhD in electrical engineering at Stanford University. He was part of the original group of students in the school's chapter of the National Society of Black Engineers (NSBE).

== Career ==
In 1976, he refined and submitted the Hunt-Szymanski algorithm, Hunt, James W.; Szymanski, Thomas G. (1977). "A fast algorithm for computing longest common subsequences". Communications of the ACM. 20 (5): 350–353. doi:10.1145/359581.359603. S2CID 3226080., a variant that was originally proposed by Harold S. Stone. It is a solution to the longest common subsequence problem. It was one of the first non-heuristic algorithms used in data comparison. To this day, variations of this algorithm are found in incremental version control systems, wiki engines, and molecular phylogenetics research software.

This ingenuity led him to become a department head at A&T Bell Labs, a unit director at UNIX System Laboratories, and finally, the Management Systems Product Realization Vice President of Lucent Technologies. He remained with Lucent for a decade before retiring in 2004.

In 1982, he also published a journal on how to use Programming Languages in IEEE (institution of electrical and electronical engineering) computers.

James W. Hunt has filed for patents to protect the following inventions. This listing includes patent applications that are pending as well as patents that have already been granted by the United States Patent and Trademark Office (USPTO).

Wall fastener-Patent number: 6004088. Abstract: This invention is a wall fastener to join abutting surfaces such as affixing a bracket to a wall. The L-shape arms of the fastener are attached with hinges to a shell or to a slidable nut enclosed in a shell which is inserted in a preformed hole or aperture in the wall. The fastener with arms attached to the slidable nut is adjustable for use with walls of varying widths. A screw holding the object to be attached is inserted in the shell and threaded through the nut (FIG. 4). The screw then engages the arms of the fastener and forces them to pivot into a clamping position (FIG. 5). The screw is turned until the arms are clamped against the wall (FIG. 6). The fastener with the arms attached to the shell is similar in operation to the adjustable fastener except its use is for walls or surfaces of the same width as the device.

Device for assembling interlocking road mat segments for temporary roads- Patent number: 5234204. Abstract: A three-dimensional frame structure for the construction of road mats is disclosed. The structure includes the components of the mat positioned to insure uniformity of assembly of mats of different sizes, with a single end structure that acts as a template and with means for moving a mat for final affixing onto a table while permitting the assembly holding structure to be repositioned for constructing another mat. A method of manufacture for road mats which utilizes a frame to position the components of the mat during the mat's manufacture into a predetermined arrangement to ensure the uniformity of each mat for interchange use in the field is also disclosed, whereby mats may be completed by the apparatus while other mats are being assembled. A temporary road comprised of two sets of mats is also disclosed. The first set of mats is laid down such that its smooth surface is on the ground.

Cash box for paper currency-Patent number: 4434931. Abstract: A cash box for paper currency has an opening therein through which a bill can be introduced into that cash box to form part of a stack of paper currency within that cash box. A closure is movable away from that opening to an open position to permit a bill to be introduced through that opening and stacked; and that closure is movable to a closed position adjacent that opening to prevent the removal of paper currency from that stack of paper currency. A latch for the closure permits the closure to be moved between the open and the closed positions; and the latch will, whenever that closure has been moved to open position and then to closed position, thereafter automatically prevent unauthorized movement of that closure out of closed position.
