= David Sankoff =

Canadian scientist

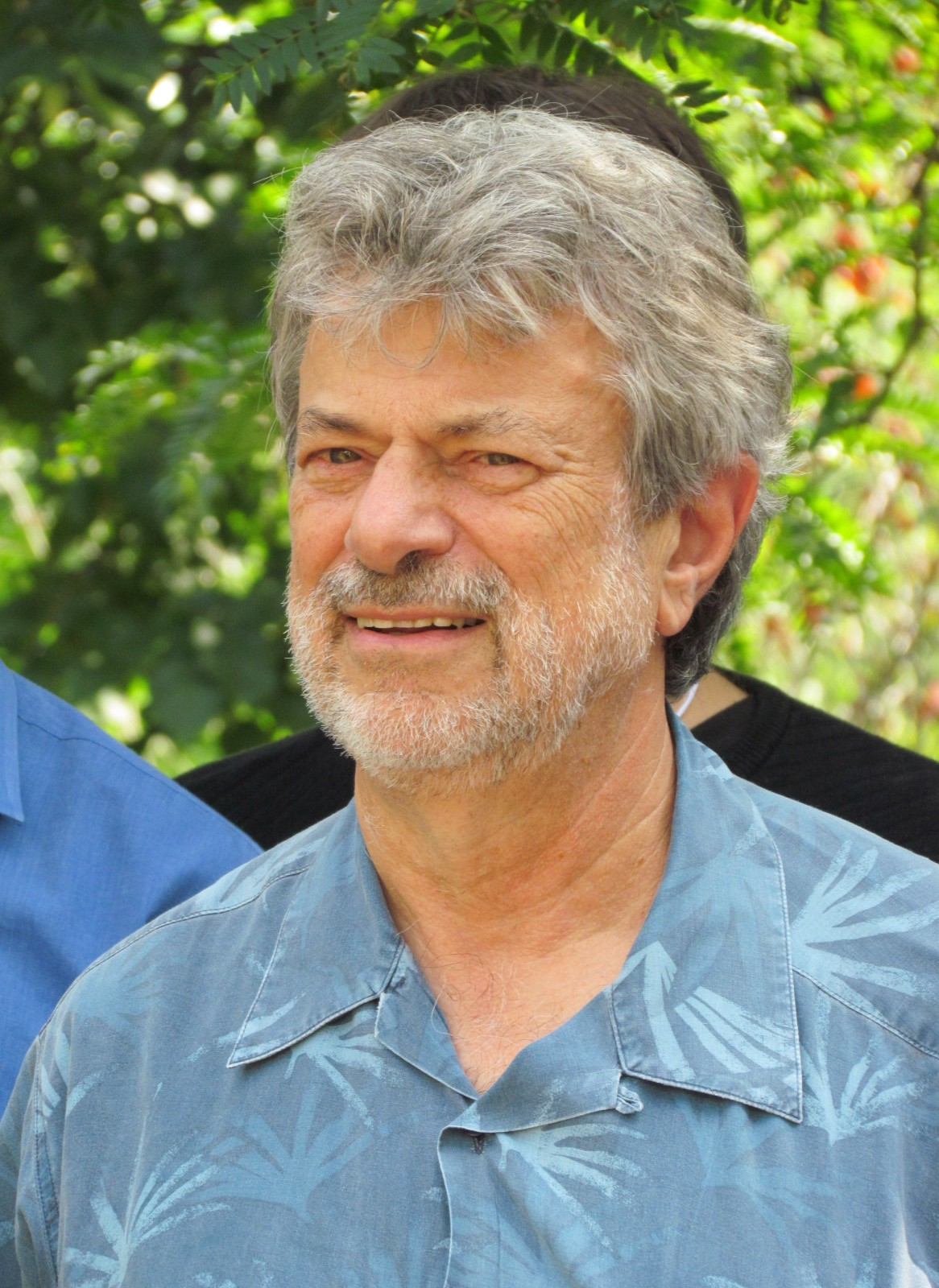
- David Sankoff at "Models and Algorithms for Genome Evolution" in 2013, Bromont, Quebec.
- Born: December 31, 1942 (age 83); Montreal, Quebec, Canada
- Education: McGill University (BSc, MSc, PhD)
- Known for: Variable rules analysis; Code switching; Sequence alignment; Nucleic acid secondary structure; Computational genomics
- Awards: Fellow of the Royal Society of Canada (1995); Canada Research Chair (2002-2016); ISCB Fellow (2009); ISCB Senior Scientist Award (2003); Weldon Memorial Prize (2004)
- Scientific career
- Fields: Genomics; Bioinformatics; Linguistics; Sociolinguistics
- Workplaces: University of Ottawa; Université de Montréal; Centre de Recherches Mathématiques; Canadian Institute for Advanced Research; Bureau of Statistics of Papua and New Guinea
- Thesis: Historical Linguistics as a Stochastic Process (1969)
- Doctoral advisor: Donald Andrew Dawson
- Website: albuquerque.bioinformatics.uottawa.ca

David Sankoff (born December 31, 1942) is a Canadian mathematician, bioinformatician, computer scientist and linguist. He holds the Canada Research Chair in Mathematical Genomics in the Mathematics and Statistics Department at the University of Ottawa, and is cross-appointed to the Biology Department and the School of Information Technology and Engineering. He was founding editor of the scientific journal Language Variation and Change (Cambridge) and serves on the editorial boards of a number of bioinformatics, computational biology and linguistics journals. Sankoff is best known for his pioneering contributions in computational linguistics and computational genomics. He is considered to be one of the founders of bioinformatics. In particular, he had a key role in introducing dynamic programming for sequence alignment and other problems in computational biology. In Pavel Pevzner's words, "Michael Waterman and David Sankoff are responsible for transforming bioinformatics from a 'stamp collection' of ill-defined problems into a rigorous discipline with important biological applications."

== Education ==
Sankoff published his first paper in 1963 while he was an undergraduate student in Mathematics at McGill University. Starting with his doctoral research, he developed mathematical formulations to a number of pivotal concepts in socio- and historical linguistics, including glottochronology, variable rules analysis (with Henrietta Cedergren), the linguistic marketplace and code switching.

== Career and research ==
After completing his Ph.D. in Mathematics, Sankoff began his academic career at the University of Montreal in 1969. In 1971, Sankoff became interested in molecular sequence comparison and devised the first quadratic-time variant of the Needleman–Wunsch algorithm for pairwise sequence alignment. In 1973, Sankoff and Robert Cedergren developed a joint estimation method for phylogeny and multiple sequence alignment of 5S ribosomal RNA, laying the algorithmic foundations of comparative genomics. In 1975, Sankoff and Václav Chvátal studied the behavior of the longest common subsequence problem on random inputs; the constants of proportionality arising in this study have come to be known as the Chvátal–Sankoff constants. In 1980, Robert Cedergen and David Sankoff created the first research group in bioinformatics at the University of Montreal. Sankoff's work in bioinformatics addresses RNA secondary structure, genome rearrangements, sequence alignment, genome evolution and phylogenetics.

=== Awards and honors ===
- Inaugural recipient of the International Society for Computational Biology's Senior Scientist Award in 2003.
- Elected a Fellow of the Royal Society of Canada (1995)
- Elected an ISCB Fellow by the International Society for Computational Biology in 2009
- Marcel-Vincent Prize (1977)
- Ontario Distinguished Researcher Award (2002)
- Weldon Memorial Prize (2004)
- University of Ottawa Excellence in Research Award (2013)
- Honorary doctorate, Tel Aviv University (2014)
