= Harold Stone =

Harold Stone may refer to:

- Harold J. Stone, American actor
- Harold S. Stone, American computer scientist
