= Altima =

Altima may refer to:

- Nissan Altima, a car
- Altima (band), a Japanese band

== See also ==
- Altima Ace, a Japanese manga magazine
- "Nissan Altima" (song), a song by Doechii
