= Fate/Zero =

Japanese light novel series and its adaptations

- First volume cover of Fate/Zero, featuring Irisviel von Einzbern (left), Saber (center), and Kiritsugu Emiya (right)

運命/ゼロ (Unmei Zero)
- Genre: Action; Dark fantasy; Tragedy
- Light novel
- Written by: Gen Urobuchi
- Illustrated by: Takashi Takeuchi
- Published by: Type-Moon
- Original run: December 29, 2006 – December 29, 2007
- Volumes: 4
- Manga
- Written by: Gen Urobuchi
- Illustrated by: Shinjirou
- Published by: Kadokawa Shoten
- English publisher: NA: Dark Horse Comics
- Magazine: Young Ace
- Original run: December 29, 2010 – June 2, 2017
- Volumes: 14
- Manga

Fate/Zero Kuro
- Written by: mendori
- Published by: Kadokawa Shoten
- Magazine: Altima Ace (2011); Monthly Asuka
- Original run: 2011 – 2012
- Volumes: 1
- Anime television series
- Directed by: Ei Aoki
- Produced by: Atsuhiro Iwakami
- Written by: Akira Hiyama; Akihiro Yoshida
- Music by: Yuki Kajiura
- Studio: Ufotable
- Licensed by: AUS: Madman Entertainment; NA: Aniplex of America; UK: MVM Films
- Original network: Tokyo MX, GYT, GTV, TV Saitama, TV Aichi, MBS, CTC, tvk, TVh, TVQ, BS11, Kids Station
- Original run: October 1, 2011 – June 23, 2012
- Episodes: 25
- icon

Fate/Zero (Note: Japanese: 運命/ゼロ, Hepburn: Unmei/Zero) is a Japanese light novel series written by Gen Urobuchi and illustrated by Takashi Takeuchi. It serves as a prequel to all routes in the Fate/stay night visual novel by Type-Moon. It was published by Type-Moon with four volumes released between December 2006 and 2007. The story follows the Fourth Holy Grail War, which is a magical tournament that is held in Fuyuki City, Japan. Seven mages known as Masters must summon Servants, which are reincarnations of legendary souls and heroes from all across time, where they fight in a deadly battle royale where the winner obtains the Holy Grail, a legendary magical chalice capable of granting wishes. The main protagonist of Fate/Zero, Kiritsugu Emiya, joins the tournament on behalf of his wife's family, the Einzberns.

An anime adaptation was produced by Ufotable, the first season of which aired from October 1 to December 24, 2011, and the second season of which aired from April 7 to June 23, 2012. A manga adaptation was published by Kadokawa Shoten between 2011 and 2017. American publisher Dark Horse Comics licensed the manga and released it in English for North America.

Fate/Zero was praised for its animation, themes, characters, soundtrack, and story. The series has also been a commercial success, with it selling over several thousand Blu-ray box-sets and winning multiple awards at the Newtype Anime Awards, including "Title of the Year".

== Plot ==
In the fictional city of Fuyuki City, Japan, assassin Kiritsugu Emiya joins Fourth Holy Grail War on behalf the Einzbern family. The Einzbern family is determined to achieve victory in the Fourth War following three consecutive failures. They were elected to bring the notorious mage killer Kiritsugu, despite his methods and reputation as a skilled mercenary and a hitman who employs all means necessary to accomplish his goals. Though Kiritsugu had once wanted to become a hero who could save everyone, he has long since abandoned this ideal upon realizing that saving one person often comes at the cost of another's life. Thus, this is the source of conflict he once sought to eliminate due to finite resources/abilities. For the sake of humanity, he resolves to ruthlessly destroy anything and anyone who threatens the peace of others.

However, Kiritsugu finds himself deeply torn between the love he has found for his new family–his wife Irisviel and their daughter Illya–and what he must do to obtain the Holy Grail. Meanwhile, Kiritsugu's greatest opponent appears in the form of the priest Kirei Kotomine. The latter is trying to discover his true nature in his quest to find the Holy Grail, which is revealed to be monstrous and full of hate. He sets his sights on Kiritsugu as a kindred spirit and possible answer to the emptiness he feels.

Towards the conclusion, the limitations of the "Holy Grail" are found to be in the fact that, while omnipotent in its wish-granting abilities, it is not omniscient, and therefore depends on the victor's knowledge and methods to determine the way by which the wish is carried out. And, to make matters worse, the last war fought over the Grail has corrupted it, causing any wish granted by the Grail to be a Monkey's Paw.

== Production and publication ==
Writer Gen Urobuchi was pitched a prequel of Fate/stay night by Takashi Takeuchi. Despite the tragedy of the ending, the good ending in Fate/stay Night would not be affected because Kiritsugu's life was a prequel. Urobuchi planned the series to end by its fourth volume. Nasu expressed his amazement for Urobuchi, and had predicted that in 2002 while unable to work on Fate/stay night due to illness that he would write an interesting story. Ideas like Saber being lectured by Gilgamesh and Alexander the Great gave him a bigger impact. When starting the project for Fate/Zero, Nasu decided to give Urobuchi complete freedom for Kiritsugu's characterization.

The idea of Fate/Zero was proposed by Urobuchi. Urobuchi explained that 90% of the proposals were accepted by Nasu. In Fate/stay night, Saber explains she had brief interactions with Kiritsugu Emiya which led to the creation of the character of Irisviel. As Kiritsugu's wife, Irisviel plays the role of facilitating communication between these two, who do not talk to each other. The distanced and ultimately dark relationship between Kiritsugu and Saber caused by the former's actions in the story led Urobuchi and Nasu to change some early drafts in the story, including the addition of Kiritsugu adopting Shirou. These changes were to create a more coherent relationship between Saber and Shirou Emiya in the original visual novel. Nasu was in charge of the use of magic rather than attempting to use real occultism. Urobuchi had difficulty ending the novels as he wanted to distance it from typical stories, but in the end decided to follow his own style. Urobuchi had no issues writing the main characters' ideologies.

The first volume was released on December 29, 2006, as a collaboration between Type-Moon and fellow developer Nitroplus. The second volume was released on March 31, 2007. The third volume was released on July 27, 2007. The fourth and final volume was released on December 29, 2007, along with the Fate/Zero Original Image Soundtrack "Return to Zero". Fate/Zero began as a light novel series written by Urobuchi with illustrations by Takashi Takeuchi. It is set as a prequel to Type-Moon's visual novel Fate/stay night.

== Media ==
=== Drama CD ===
Four sets of drama CDs were released from 2008 to 2010. A soundtrack entitled Return to Zero was released on December 31, 2007.

Following the airing of the anime adaption, drama CDs written by Urobuchi were bundled with the series' Blu-Ray box sets released from 2011 to 2012.

=== Anime ===
The anime adaptation was approved for production by December 2010. It was produced by studio Ufotable and began airing in October 2011. Fate/Zero is the third anime production in the Fate series, following the 24-episode 2006 adaptation and the 2010 Unlimited Blade Works film.

=== Manga ===
The manga adaptation illustrated by Shinjirō was serialized in Young Ace between December 29, 2010, and June 2, 2017, compiled in fourteen volumes. In September 2014, Dark Horse Comics announced that they had licensed the manga. They released eight volumes from 2016 to 2019. A parody manga, Fate/Zero Kuro by mendori was serialized in 2011 and 2012 in Altima Ace and then Monthly Asuka and compiled into one volume in 2013.

==== Fate/Zero ====
No.	Japanese release date	Japanese ISBN
1	September 1, 2011	978-4-04-715771-2
2	October 4, 2011	978-4-04-715771-2
3	March 26, 2012	978-4-04-715819-1
4	July 4, 2012	978-4-04-120401-6
5	February 1, 2013	978-4-04-120563-1
6	July 3, 2013	978-4-04-120800-7
7	February 5, 2014	978-4-04-120991-2
8	September 26, 2014	978-4-04-102022-7
9	December 29, 2014	978-4-04-102023-4
10	June 26, 2015	978-4-04-103086-8
11	November 4, 2015	978-4-04-103087-5
12	June 25, 2016	978-4-04-104168-0
13	December 31, 2016	978-4-04-104169-7
14	August 26, 2017	978-4-04-105796-4

==== Fate/Zero Kuro ====
No.	Japanese release date	Japanese ISBN
1	July 4, 2013	978-4-04-120799-4

=== Other ===
An art book entitled Fate/Zero material was released on August 8, 2008. Published by Type-Moon, the book contains a compilation of the published and promotional art from the novel, detailed character profiles and memo sections, and an overview of the novel's plot. Two video game adaptations for smartphones, Fate/Zero The Adventure and Fate/Zero Next Encounter, were released in Japan. In 2016, a special event entitled Fate/Accel Zero Order was held from 27 April to 11 May. The scenario was written by Gen Urobuchi and the animation was produced by ufotable.

== Awards ==
The light novel took sixth place in its respective category in the 2015 Sugoi Japan Awards.
