= Linguistic capital =

Sociolinguistic term

Linguistic capital is a sociolinguistic term coined by French sociologist and philosopher Pierre Bourdieu. Bourdieu describes linguistic capital as a form of cultural capital, and specifically as the accumulation of a single person's linguistic skills that predetermines their position in society as delegated by powerful institutions. Cultural capital, on the other hand, is a conglomeration of knowledge, skills, and other cultural acquisitions, which is enhanced by educational or technical qualifications.

As a form of communication, language mediates human interactions and is a form of an action itself. According to Joseph Sung-Yul Park, "language is understood as a form of capital that is mediated through social power relations." These power relations are reflected through language when one's language is decided to be legitimate, allowing access to economic and social opportunities such as jobs, services, and connections.

Linguistic capital has been used to describe the different language resources available to a single person and the values associated with each resource. Today, this term is used to look at the way in which these resources play a role in power dynamics at all levels, from individual, familial, institutional, governmental, and international roles. Bourdieu's theories on capital are effective in showcasing how various skills and resources gathered over an individual or group's lifetime will have different values and connotations depending on the situation and demographics. When and where those resources are recognized and valued, often for the benefit or enhancement of the lives of the dominant social group, they can be converted into capital.

== Linguistic marketplace ==
The notion of the market value of a language refers to the ability of the language to bring social and economic benefits to its speaker. Languages have a market value and a non-market value. A language has market value if said language can be used for monetary gain, or if the language can be assigned a price. For example, if someone speaks language X, they have easier access to the economic and social well-being in the X-speaking communities, which in turn may lead to their financial gain. Jan Blommaert (2009) provides a clear example of how the high market value of the American English accent creates jobs for those who speak and know how to teach this accent while also allowing some to consume this skill in the form of learning. In other situations, an employee earns more money simply because they speak language X. In these circumstances language X has a high market value.

The market value of a language is based on the symbolic power associated with the language as well as the language ideologies about the language and its speakers. The non-market value in this theoretical perspective relies more on the language ideologies. One of the ways of explaining the non-market value of the language is by considering the connection between the language and the culture. For example, a speaker of X has access to the culture associated with the language X and the whole speech community of X. Because this sort of value brings intangible benefits to the speaker, it cannot be measured in terms of market prices. The non-market value of languages is what is generally used to explain the need for the linguistic diversity: high linguistic variation and multilingualism is generally valued as a part of a healthy language ecology, which is why some countries strive to promote multilingualism. Both market and non-market values can affect whether an individual decides to learn a language.

According to Bourdieu, people's utterances can be seen as their linguistic products, and they can anticipate the value of their products in the marketplace through different contexts. Different speakers have different quantities of linguistic capital, that is, different speakers have different capacities to produce expressions that are valuable for a specific market. This explains why individuals vary their linguistic expressions, such as register, to be appropriate to their current market, such as in a workplace, with family, or in education. Like other forms of capital, the linguistic capital that an individual possesses is a metaphorical expression that may reflect the individual's position in social space.

== Power Language Index ==
In a study conducted by the European Institute of Business Administration, Kai Chan created a Power Language Index (PLI) that ranked languages based on five opportunities provided by language comprehension: the ability to travel widely, the ability to earn a livelihood, the ability to communicate with others, the ability to acquire knowledge and consume media, and the ability to engage in diplomacy. Within these five sections, Chan used 20 indicators such as the GDP associated with countries that speak a certain language, the amount of land area where a language is spoken, and amount of internet/media content associated with a language to rank them. From his research Chan concluded that English is not only the most powerful language overall, but also the most powerful language across the five categories. The second most powerful language, Mandarin, was deemed to be only half as powerful as English because, although it is the language spoken by the most people in the world, it is not spoken widely outside of Mandarin nations. Other languages in the top ten may be strong in one or two categories (such as French for diplomacy or Hindi in the knowledge and media category), but none have the equivalent across-the-board dominance of English.

== Regional research ==
=== Canada ===
Although Canada has two official languages, English and French, immigrants to Canada may not value learning each language the same. Huot et al. found that English held much more linguistic capital. The researchers interviewed ten immigrants from various backgrounds living in London, Ontario, to examine "the power of language in shaping immigrants' engagement in occupations during their integration into a host society." The researchers asked participants about their integration into the new community and their experiences in finding an occupation. From the interviews, the researchers discovered that for all ten participants, learning English was an essential aspect of their integration into Canadian society. Whether it is for finding work, making daily interactions easier, or for giving their children better opportunities, each of the participants found learning English to be far more important than learning French. As one of the participants described:

"We have to make an incredible effort, like I did, to learn [English] and to speak it perfectly, to search, to study, to volunteer, to look for work. And then after a few...it doesn't take a lot of time, 2 years, 3 years, and... why not? It's worth it. Otherwise, they [immigrants] will remain always reclusive, on the margins of society, and it will be difficult for society and difficult for them."

Relating the study back to the concepts of Bourdieu, the researchers explain how Bourdieu believed that "those whose linguistic resources are devalued are also perceived to be less competent." By learning and speaking English, the immigrants in this study were able to acquire more linguistic capital, be perceived as being more competent, and establish themselves in Canadian society.

=== South Korea ===
In the case of South Korea, being able to speak English proficiently also elevates one's status within society. However, as explained by Joseph Sung-Yul Park, since Korean is the dominant language, the ability to speak English is valued by certain businesses and universities but is not a requirement to fit into South Korean society. Many South Koreans view the ability to speak English as a valuable commodity that better allows them to obtain university degrees and high-paying jobs. In this sense, South Koreans recognize that being able to speak Korean will only get them so far and that they will need to learn English because it holds more linguistic capital internationally. Park provides a report from Korean technology giant Samsung's Economic Research Institute that states: "Individual workers can increase their competitiveness in employment, promotion, and self-development through improving their English language skills."

Parents in South Korea, according to Park, also go to great lengths to provide their children with the advantage of being able to speak English. Children are often enrolled in English-only kindergartens and in some cases placed in study abroad programs in English-speaking countries when they are young in order to better develop a native English-speaking accent. Enormous amounts of money are put forth by Korean parents to ensure that their children can learn English and have a greater chance of success in the future. This will likely continue in Korea because, as long as English maintains its position as the dominant language in international business, Korean businesses will continue to place a high value on employees who are able to speak the language.

=== United States ===
In their research on the cognitive benefits of bilingualism, Barac and Bialystok highlighted how individuals, especially children who possess linguistic competency in two or more languages, perform better than monolingual individuals on a variety of cognitive measures, such as problem solving tasks. Later in life, bilingual people reportedly have a five-year delay over monolingual individuals developing dementia, since some additional neural pathways are kept open and functional as a result of using two or more languages. Additionally, more professional opportunities become available to the individuals who speak more than one language. For example, because Spanish is the second largest language in the US, there is a high demand for people who are bilingual in Spanish. So on the one hand, it can be concluded that Spanish speakers possess the linguistic capital, however, the political implications that are tied in with Spanish bilingualism bring down the market value of Spanish bilingualism especially among those who speak it natively.

== Linguistic capital and lingua franca ==
English is often considered to be the lingua franca of the world today due to the diversity of countries and communities that have adopted English as a national, commercial, or social form of communication. Globalization, colonialism, and the capitalist system have all helped promote English as the world's dominant language, supplemented by years of British and American hegemony on the world stage. Today, nearly 1.39 billion people speak English according to the World Economic Forum, with its prominence over other languages highlighted through the geographic diversity of where it is spoken. According to Arwen Armbrecht, Mandarin Chinese is the most spoken first language in the world, however its influence lags behind English due to its limited use outside of Mandarin-speaking nations. As a result, the linguistic capital of Mandarin Chinese cannot be fully compared to that of English, which allows English to have such an important role around the globe.

== Critiques ==
=== English's prominence on the Internet ===
Mandarin Chinese is the most spoken language in the world by the number of native first language speakers. However, it is not considered the lingua franca of the world, English is. Many scholars attribute the widespread use of English largely to the internet. There are more Chinese nationals surfing the internet than any other nationality in the world, however English remains the most commonly spoken language on the internet. This can be attributed to multiple factors such as the use of websites primarily designed for the use of Chinese for the Chinese people, and a censored internet. This can be described as a means of creating a form of linguistic isolation. According to Ambricht, the use of Mandarin as a lingua franca is not spreading because "it's limited to networks such as Sina Weibo (Chinese Twitter) and Baidu Baike (Chinese Wikipedia). A similar phenomenon can be seen in Russia, where VK (Russian Facebook) is used more than many global social networks." The users of these social networks create online speech communities that stay away from the English-speaking internet but also hinder the integration of their language into globalized media flows.

=== Linguistic Marxism ===
Linguistic Marxism arose from linguists in the Soviet Union. It was attempt to construct a theory of the development, structure, and functioning of language based on Marxist foundations. Marxist linguists' works existed in the form of "methodological outlines." It is also apparent that Marx's and Engels' thoughts on language were not specifically linguistic issues. They considered questions of language that would make their positions on social sciences clearer. These social sciences were history, political economy, and philosophy, but not linguistics.

The specific ideas that challenge linguistic capital came about while Stalin was the leader of the Soviet Union. Stalin responded to Soviet linguists in letters of reply from an article from June 20, 1950. Stalin claimed that "language does not pertain to either the economic or subsistence structure of a society (basis) or the political, religious, legal, philosophical, and artistic views of society (superstructure). Language, instead belongs to the "whole course of history of the society and of the history of the bases for many centuries." Stalin saw language and culture as two separate things, and claimed that many people commit the mistake of associating the two. He claimed that culture changes with every new period, but language stays relatively the same throughout the several periods. This divorce of culture and language is the opposite of what linguistic capital entails.

== See also ==
- Linguistic marketplace
