= Contrastive distribution =

A contrastive distribution in linguistics is a relationship between two or more different elements which can appear in the same environment, but cause a change in meaning when one is substituted for another in that environment. A contrastive distribution is demonstrated with a minimal pair.

Contrastive distribution is distinct from complementary distribution (where different elements appear in different environments and cannot be substituted for one another) and free variation (where different elements, particularly speech sounds, appear in the same environment and can be substituted without changing the meaning).

== Phonology ==
In phonology, two sounds of a language are said to be in contrastive distribution if replacing one with the other in the same phonological environment results in a change in meaning. The existence of a contrastive distribution between two speech sound plays an important role in establishing that they belong to two separate phonemes in a given language.

For example, in English, the speech sounds [s] and [z] can both occur at the beginning of a word, as in the words sip and zip. Since [s] and [z] both occur in the same phonological environment (i.e. at the beginning of a word) but change the meaning of the word they form, they are in contrastive distribution and therefore provide evidence for their belonging to separate phonemes.

== Morphology ==
In morphology, two morphemes are in contrastive distribution if they occur in the same environment, but have different meanings.

For example, in Korean, noun phrases are followed by one of the various markers that indicate syntactic role: /-ka/, /-i/, /-(l)ul/, etc. /-ka/ and /-i/ are in complementary distribution. They are both used to indicate nominative case, and their occurrence is conditioned by the final sound of the preceding noun. If the noun ends in a consonant, /-i/ occurs; otherwise, /-ka/. /-(l)ul/, on the other hand, occurs in the same position as /-i/ or /-ka/ and is also conditioned by the immediately previous sound, but it indicates the accusative case. Therefore, /-(l)ul/ and the set {/-i/, /-ka/} are in contrastive distribution.

== Syntax ==
In syntax, the requirements are similar. In English, the expression of the indicative and the subjunctive moods is contrastive:

(1) If I am a rich man, then I have a lot of money.
(2) If I were a rich man, then I would have a lot of money.

The change from non-past first-person singular indicative am to the subjunctive were results in a change in the grammatical mood of the sentence.

== See also ==
- Allomorph
- Allophone
- Complementary distribution
- Free variation
- Minimal pair
- Phoneme
- Sociolinguistics
- Variable rules analysis
