= The Case Files of Biblia Bookstore =

Japanese light novel series

- First light novel volume cover, featuring Shioriko Shinokawa

ビブリア古書堂の事件手帖 (Biburia Koshodō no Jiken Techō)
- Genre: Mystery
- Light novel
- Written by: En Mikami
- Illustrated by: Hagu Koshijima
- Published by: ASCII Media Works
- Imprint: Media Works Bunko
- Original run: March 25, 2011 – present
- Volumes: 12
- Manga
- Written by: En Mikami
- Illustrated by: Nakano
- Published by: Kadokawa Shoten
- Imprint: Kadokawa Comics Ace
- Magazine: Altima Ace (2012); Monthly Asuka (2012–2014)
- Original run: February 18, 2012 – July 24, 2014
- Volumes: 6
- Manga
- Written by: En Mikami
- Illustrated by: Ryō Kōda
- Published by: Kodansha
- Imprint: Good! Afternoon KC
- Magazine: Good! Afternoon
- Original run: July 6, 2012 – September 6, 2013
- Volumes: 3
- Live-action film
- Directed by: Yukiko Mishima
- Produced by: Miho Hattori; Hidehisa Chiwata
- Written by: Ryohei Watanabe; Kana Matsui
- Music by: Gorō Yasukawa
- Studio: Kadokawa Daiei Studio
- Released: November 1, 2018
- Runtime: 121 minutes
- Manga
- Written by: En Mikami
- Illustrated by: Haruki Niwa
- Published by: Kadokawa Shoten
- Imprint: Kadokawa Comics Ace
- Magazine: Young Ace Up
- Original run: February 23, 2024 – present
- Volumes: 3
- Anime television series
- Directed by: Mamoru Kanbe; Ayato Kurata (assistant)
- Written by: Toshiya Ono
- Music by: Takahiro Obata
- Studio: CloverWorks
- Original run: April 2027 – scheduled
- Television drama
- The Case Files of Biblia Bookstore (2013)
- icon

The Case Files of Biblia Bookstore (Japanese: ビブリア古書堂の事件手帖, Hepburn: Biburia Koshodō no Jiken Techō; lit. 'Antiquarian Bookshop Biblia Case Files') is a Japanese light novel series written by En Mikami and illustrated by Hagu Koshijima. It began publication by ASCII Media Works' Media Works Bunko imprint in March 2011; twelve volumes have been released. The novel has been adapted into three manga series, a television drama, and a live-action film. An anime television series adaptation produced by CloverWorks is set to premiere in April 2027.

== Plot ==
The shy and introverted Shioriko Shinokawa has a passion for books and for solving mysteries. A young man named Daisuke Gōra, who grew up without reading books due to a "phobia", brings the complete (and autographed) works of Natsume Sōseki, a writer of the Meiji era. They try to solve the mysteries they find inside the books.

== Characters ==
Shioriko Shinokawa (篠川 栞子, Shinokawa Shioriko)
Voiced by: Riko Akechi
Portrayed by: Ayame Goriki (TV drama), Haru Kuroki (film)
The owner of Biblia Antiquarian Bookshop. She is extremely shy, but a true bookworm with exceptional knowledge of antique books. She has a quick mind and excellent deductive reasoning skills.
Daisuke Gōra (五浦 大輔, Gōra Daisuke)
Voiced by: Shunsuke Takeuchi
Portrayed by: Akira (TV drama), Shūhei Nomura (film)
A young man who, due to a certain incident, has developed a condition that prevents him from reading books. His tall, sturdy build and intimidating appearance often lead to misunderstandings, but he dislikes conflict. He harbors a kind of longing for books.
Nao Kosuga (小菅 奈緒, Kosuga Nao)
Voiced by: Saeko Kamijō
Portrayed by: Elina Mizuno (TV drama)
A tall high school girl with striking short hair. She has a tomboyish way of speaking.
Hajime Shida (志田 肇, Shida Hajime)
Voiced by: Wataru Takagi
Portrayed by: Katsumi Takahashi (TV drama)
A regular man at Biblia Antiquarian Bookstore. A book reseller who mainly deals in out-of-print paperbacks. He has a somewhat suspicious appearance, but his eye for books is genuine.
Kikuya Kasai (笠井 菊哉, Kasai Kikuya)
Voiced by: Yōhei Azakami
Portrayed by: Kei Tanaka (TV drama)
He is a reseller that primarily uses online auctions as its sales channel. He mainly deals in out-of-print CDs and games.
Ayaka Shinokawa (篠川 文香, Shinokawa Ayaka)
Voiced by: Reo Osanai
Shioriko's younger sister. In contrast to her sister, she is a bright, sociable, and honest high school girl who cannot keep secrets. She is good at cooking and is adept at all household chores.

== Media ==
=== Light novel ===
Written by En Mikami and illustrated by Hagu Koshijima, the light novel began publication by ASCII Media Works under their Media Works Bunko imprint on March 25, 2011. As of April 2026, twelve volumes have been released.

No.	Release date	ISBN
1	March 25, 2011	978-4-04-870469-4
2	October 25, 2011	978-4-04-870824-1
3	June 23, 2012	978-4-04-886658-3
4	February 22, 2013	978-4-04-891427-7
5	January 24, 2014	978-4-04-866226-0
6	December 25, 2014	978-4-04-869189-5
7	February 25, 2017	978-4-04-892640-9
8	September 22, 2018	978-4-04-912044-8
9	July 18, 2020	978-4-04-913083-6
10	March 25, 2022	978-4-04-913952-5
11	March 23, 2024	978-4-04-915298-2
12	April 24, 2026	978-4-04-916324-7

=== Manga ===
A manga adaptation, illustrated by Nakano, began serialization in Kadokawa Shoten's magazine Altima Ace on February 18, 2012. In October 2012, Altima Ace ceased publication; the manga was transferred to Monthly Asuka. The series finished serialization on July 24, 2014, with its individual chapters being collected into six tankōbon volumes.

No.	Release date	ISBN
1	June 21, 2012	978-4-04-120371-2
2	August 1, 2013	978-4-04-120581-5
3	July 23, 2013	978-4-04-120780-2
4	January 25, 2014	978-4-04-120943-1
5	March 26, 2014	978-4-04-121053-6
6	September 26, 2014	978-4-04-102113-2

A second manga adaptation, illustrated by Ryō Kōda, was serialized in Kodansha's Good! Afternoon magazine from July 6, 2012 to September 6, 2013. Its individual chapters were collected into three tankōbon volumes.

No.	Release date	ISBN
1	December 21, 2012	978-4-06-387866-0
2	June 7, 2013	978-4-06-387901-8
3	January 23, 2014	978-4-06-387943-8

A third manga adaptation, illustrated by Haruki Niwa, was serialized on Kadokawa Shoten's Young Ace Up website on February 23, 2024. As of November 2025, its individual chapters have been collected into three tankōbon volumes.

No.	Release date	ISBN
1	August 2, 2024	978-4-04-114514-2
2	January 10, 2025	978-4-04-115797-8
3	November 4, 2025	978-4-04-811521-6

=== Television drama ===
A television drama adaptation aired on Fuji TV from January 14 to March 25, 2013. It starred Ayame Goriki and Akira. Crunchyroll released the series outside of Japan.

=== Live-action film ===
A live-action film adaptation was announced in February 2017. It was directed by Yukiko Mishima and starred Haru Kuroki and Shūhei Nomura. It was released by Kadokawa and 20th Century Fox on November 1, 2018.

=== Anime ===
An anime film adaptation was also originally announced alongside the live-action film in February 2017, but was never released following the announcement. An anime television series adaptation was announced in April 2026. It will be produced by CloverWorks and directed by Mamoru Kanbe, with Ayato Kurata as assistant director, Toshiyo Ona in series composition, Jun Nakai handling character designs and chief animation direction, and Takahiro Obata composing the music. The series is set to premiere in April 2027.

== Reception ==
The novel was nominated for Mystery Writers of Japan Award in the Novel category in 2012 and 2014. In 2012, it was nominated for the Japan Booksellers' Award.

The novel was the first work published under Media Works Bunko to sell one million copies. As of February 2017, the light novels had 6.4 million copies in print. As of June 2020, it had sold seven million copies. As of April 2026, the series had sold 8.5 million copies.
