= Haruhi Suzumiya =

Japanese light novel series

- First light novel volume cover of Haruhi Suzumiya, featuring the titular character

涼宮ハルヒ (Suzumiya Haruhi)
- Genre: Comedy; Science fiction
- Light novel
- Written by: Nagaru Tanigawa
- Illustrated by: Noizi Ito
- Published by: Kadokawa Shoten
- English publisher: NA: Yen Press
- Imprint: Kadokawa Sneaker Bunko; Kadokawa Tsubasa Bunko; Kadokawa Bunko
- Magazine: The Sneaker (short stories only)
- Original run: June 6, 2003 – present
- Volumes: 13
- Manga
- Written by: Makoto Mizuno
- Published by: Kadokawa Shoten
- Magazine: Shōnen Ace
- Original run: March 26, 2004 – October 26, 2004
- Volumes: 1
- Manga

The Melancholy of Haruhi Suzumiya
- Written by: Gaku Tsugano
- Published by: Kadokawa Shoten
- English publisher: NA: Yen Press
- Magazine: Shōnen Ace
- Original run: September 26, 2005 – September 26, 2013
- Volumes: 20
- Anime television series

The Melancholy of Haruhi Suzumiya
- Directed by: Tatsuya Ishihara; Yutaka Yamamoto (Note: Series Unit Director (シリーズ演出))
- Produced by: Hideaki Hatta; Atushi Itou
- Music by: Satoru Kōsaki
- Studio: Kyoto Animation
- Licensed by: Crunchyroll (Note: In North America through Crunchyroll, LLC (formerly known as Funimation) and in Australia through Crunchyroll Store Australia (formerly known as Madman Entertainment)); SEA: Odex; UK: Anime Limited (season 1) Manga Entertainment (season 2)
- Original network: CTC, SUN, Tokyo MX, TVA, TVh, tvk, TVS
- English network: SEA: Animax
- Original run: Original airing: April 2, 2006 – July 2, 2006; Rebroadcast: (with new episodes); April 3, 2009 – October 9, 2009
- Episodes: 14 (original); 28 (rebroadcast)
- Manga

The Melancholy of Suzumiya Haruhi-chan
- Written by: Puyo
- Published by: Kadokawa Shoten
- English publisher: NA: Yen Press
- Magazine: Shōnen Ace; The Sneaker
- Original run: July 26, 2007 – December 26, 2018
- Volumes: 12
- Manga

Nyorōn Churuya-san
- Written by: Eretto
- Published by: Kadokawa Shoten
- Magazine: Comp Ace
- Original run: November 2008 – October 2009
- Volumes: 1
- Original net animation

The Melancholy of Haruhi-chan Suzumiya
- Directed by: Yasuhiro Takemoto
- Studio: Kyoto Animation
- Licensed by: Crunchyroll
- Released: February 13, 2009 – May 15, 2009
- Runtime: 2–8 minutes
- Episodes: 25
- Original net animation

Nyorōn Churuya-san
- Directed by: Yasuhiro Takemoto
- Studio: Kyoto Animation
- Licensed by: Crunchyroll
- Released: February 13, 2009 – May 15, 2009
- Runtime: 2 minutes
- Episodes: 13
- Manga

The Intrigues of Koizumi Itsuki-kun
- Written by: Puyo
- Published by: Kadokawa Shoten
- English publisher: NA: Yen Press
- Magazine: Altima Ace
- Original run: April 18, 2012 – October 18, 2012
- Related
- The Disappearance of Haruhi Suzumiya (2010 anime film); The Disappearance of Nagato Yuki-chan (manga/anime); Haruhi Suzumiya video games
- icon

Haruhi Suzumiya (Japanese: 涼宮ハルヒ, Hepburn: Suzumiya Haruhi) is a Japanese light novel series written by Nagaru Tanigawa and illustrated by Noizi Ito. It was first published in 2003 by Kadokawa Shoten in Japan with the novel The Melancholy of Haruhi Suzumiya, and has since been followed by 12 additional novel volumes, an anime television series adaptation produced by Kyoto Animation, four manga series, an animated film, two original net animation series and several video games.

After the anime adaptation aired in 2006, publishing company Kadokawa Shoten received offers for licensing the novels and their adaptations. The novels are licensed for English language release in the United States by Yen Press and Little, Brown Books for Young Readers, and the anime adaptation was licensed for North American distribution by Kadokawa Pictures USA division which then sub-licensed production and distribution to Bandai Entertainment. The anime is currently licensed by Crunchyroll.

== Plot ==
Kyon is a sardonic, witty student at North High School in Nishinomiya who once sought to have an extraordinary life, but after deeming the notion childish, now seeks little more than a normal life. At school, however, he ends up befriending Haruhi Suzumiya, an eccentric schoolgirl that sits behind him in class who is constantly seeking to make life more interesting for herself, ranging from doing her hair a certain way each day of the week to actively searching for supernatural phenomena and figures. One day, Kyon accidentally plants in Haruhi's head the idea for her to start a club to engage in her eccentricities, so she establishes a club called the "SOS Brigade" (SOS団, Esu-Ō-Esu Dan), short for "Spreading excitement all Over the world with Haruhi Suzumiya Brigade" (Note: 世界を大いに盛り上げるための涼宮ハルヒの団, Sekai o Ōini Moriageru Tame no Suzumiya Haruhi no Dan) (In the school's official paperwork Kyon renamed it "Support the Student Body by Overworking to Make the World a Better Place Student Service Brigade") to investigate mysterious events, while roping Kyon into being a member himself.

Haruhi soon recruits three additional members: the laconic bibliophile Yuki Nagato, the shy and timid Mikuru Asahina, and the unflappable transfer student Itsuki Koizumi. Over time, these members soon reveal themselves to Kyon to be the types of extraordinary characters that Haruhi seeks: Yuki is an alien interface sent by a hive mind; Mikuru is a time traveler sent from the future; and Itsuki is an esper that works for a secret society. Each of them have been sent by their respective organizations to observe Haruhi, who is unaware that she masters the powers of a god. Haruhi's powers grant her the ability to create and destroy the fabric of reality on a whim. They activate without her knowledge whenever she wills really hard for something to happen or when she is in a bad mood. Each of the organizations believe that should Haruhi learn of her powers or be put in a bad enough mood, it could destroy the entire universe. As such, the three club members, together with Kyon, work to keep life happy for Haruhi to prevent such an apocalyptic scenario under the guise of being part of the S.O.S. Brigade, as well as combating external threats that seek to exploit Haruhi, all while forming a bond as a band of misfits.

== Publication ==
Written by Nagaru Tanigawa and illustrated by Noizi Ito, the light novels alternate between full-length novels and collections of short stories and novellas that initially appeared in The Sneaker, a seinen novel magazine published by the Japanese publishing company Kadokawa Shoten. Kadokawa Shoten published 11 volumes from June 6, 2003, to May 25, 2011. In an official guidebook titled The Observation of Haruhi Suzumiya published in June 2011, Tanigawa mentioned in an interview that he had finalized the plot for at least one more volume in the series. A short story was published in a special one-time revival issue of The Sneaker on October 31, 2018. A 12th novel, The Intuition of Haruhi Suzumiya, was announced in August 2020 for release in Japan on November 25, after a 9-year break from publishing.

The novels are licensed for release in North America by Little, Brown Books for Young Readers and Yen Press. The novels will be reprinted under Yen Press's Yen On imprint. They are also available in Taiwan, Hong Kong and mainland China by Kadokawa Media; in South Korea by Daiwon CI; in Spain and Argentina by Editorial Ivrea; in Italy by Edizioni BD; in Thailand by Bongkoch Books; and in Vietnam by IPM.

== Media ==
=== Manga ===
Kadokawa Shoten published two manga adaptations of the Haruhi Suzumiya light novel series in Shōnen Ace. The first one, by Makoto Mizuno, ran from May to December 2004 issues and was partially compiled in one volume published in August 2004. The second series, illustrated by Gaku Tsugano, ran from November 2005 and to November 2013 issues, having been published in 20 volumes, with a younger target audience than the original novels. Though mostly consisting of straight adaptations of the light novels, the manga also included 13 new stories scattered throughout, each one chapter long, and most of them spinning off of one of the light novel stories. On April 17, 2008, Yen Press announced that they had acquired the license for the North American release of the first four volumes of the second manga series, promising the manga would not be censored.

An official parody four-panel comic strip titled The Melancholy of Suzumiya Haruhi-chan by Puyo started serialization in Shōnen Ace on July 26, 2007, and in The Sneaker on August 30, 2007. It ended on December 26, 2018, and was compiled in twelve volumes. The first bound volume was released on May 26, 2008, and the last on May 1, 2019. Yen Press licensed the Haruhi-chan manga series for an English release in North America and released the first volume on October 26, 2010 and the last on May 26, 2020. Another four-panel parody manga, Nyorōn Churuya-san by Eretto (Utsura Uraraka), was originally a dōjinshi starring a smoked cheese-loving, super deformed version of Tsuruya, published in three volumes (released in August 2006, February 2007, and October 2007) before being serialized in the magazine Comp Ace between November 2008 and October 2009 issues and being released in one bound volume.

Another manga, The Disappearance of Nagato Yuki-chan (長門有希ちゃんの消失, Nagato Yuki-chan no Shōshitsu), also by Puyo, was serialized in Kadokawa Shoten's Young Ace between the July 2009 and September 2016 issues and was compiled into ten tankōbon volumes. It is set in an alternate universe of the altered timeline established in the fourth light novel, The Disappearance of Haruhi Suzumiya, where Yuki Nagato is an accident-prone video game addict as opposed to the shy bookworm of the altered timeline and the laconic alien of the original timeline. Yuki-chan has also been licensed in North America by Yen Press. Another spin-off manga by Puyo, titled The Intrigues of Koizumi Itsuki-kun (古泉一樹くんの陰謀, Koizumi Itsuki-kun no Inbō), launched in the May 2012 issue of Kadokawa Shoten's Altima Ace magazine on April 18, 2012 and the fourth and last chapter was released in the November 2012 issue on October 18, 2012, the final issue of Altima Ace. The chapters were compiled in the ninth volume of The Melancholy of Suzumiya Haruhi-chan.

=== Anime ===
The anime adaptation of The Melancholy of Haruhi Suzumiya (涼宮ハルヒの憂鬱, Suzumiya Haruhi no Yūutsu), produced by the Japanese animation studio Kyoto Animation and directed by Tatsuya Ishihara, contained 14 episodes which aired in Japan between April 2 and July 2, 2006. It was originally aired in a nonlinear order, with the prologue and first seven chapters of the first novel intermixed with chapters from some of the later novels. The "next episode" previews feature two different episode numberings: one number from Haruhi, who numbers the episodes in chronological order, and one number from Kyon, who numbered them in broadcast order. The DVD releases start with "Episode 00" and are then shown in chronological order, with Yuki narrating the "next episode" previews.

The anime was licensed and distributed by Bandai Entertainment over four DVDs released between May and November 2007. A complete box set was released on July 29, 2008. It was broadcast in Italy on Rai 4 between October 24, 2010, and February 6, 2011. Each of the North American releases offered a limited edition collector's set featuring the English dub DVD in chronological order, a subbed-only disc containing the episodes in broadcast order, and an official CD release of the opening, ending, and insert songs appearing in the show.

The second season of the anime series was announced in a full-page advertisement of Asahi Shimbun on July 7, 2007, in Japan. Promotional videos included a live action sequence, inspired by the "Bamboo Leaf Rhapsody" chapter from the third novel The Boredom of Haruhi Suzumiya, depicting Haruhi and Kyon breaking into a school shown by footage taken from surveillance cameras. On December 18, 2007, the anime's official website, haruhi.tv, was replaced by a faux 404 error with five form-input fields, a reference to the pivotal date in The Disappearance of Haruhi Suzumiya, the fourth volume in the light novel series.

A re-broadcast of the first series began in April 2009. Following a comment by Teletama, one of the broadcasting stations, that the 2009 broadcast would be 28 episodes long, there was speculation that the re-broadcast would be followed by the second season, though this was not confirmed by Kadokawa at the time. The first new episode, "Bamboo Leaf Rhapsody" (笹の葉ラプソディ, Sasa no Ha Rapusodi), was aired on May 21, 2009, as the eighth episode of the re-broadcast. Unlike the original run, the re-broadcast was shown in chronological order, with new episodes intermixed with the old ones. Episodes were later shown on Kadokawa's YouTube channel after the broadcast and started showing English-subtitled episodes. The second season features the controversial "Endless Eight" story arc, in which the members of the SOS Brigade are stuck in a time loop which lasts for eight episodes, each of which is practically identical. Bandai Entertainment licensed the re-broadcast in 2010 and released a complete collection in North America on September 14, 2010. Manga Entertainment released the season in a 4-disc DVD box set, including the Haruhi-chan mini-episodes, in the UK on July 4, 2011. Following the 2012 closure of Bandai Entertainment, Funimation announced at Otakon 2014 that they had licensed the anime television series. Following Sony's acquisition of Crunchyroll, the series was moved to Crunchyroll.

==== Spinoffs ====
Two spinoff original net animation series based on the parody manga The Melancholy of Suzumiya Haruhi-chan (涼宮ハルヒちゃんの憂鬱, Suzumiya Haruhi-chan no Yūutsu) by Puyo and Nyoro~n Churuya-san (にょろーん☆ちゅるやさん) by Eretto were announced in the October 2008 issue of the Shōnen Ace magazine. The two series were streamed in Japanese and with English subtitles on Kadokawa's YouTube channel between February 13 and May 15, 2009. All the voice actors of the original anime reprised their roles in both series. The first DVD of the series was released in Japan on May 29, 2009, with a release on Blu-ray Disc on August 27, 2010. The series has been licensed by Bandai Entertainment and has been dubbed by Bang Zoom! Entertainment for DVD release. The first volume was released on October 5, 2010. As with the original TV anime, the two series have been re-licensed by Funimation. An anime adaptation of The Disappearance of Nagato Yuki-chan by Satelight began airing in April 2015 and is licensed by Funimation, who began streaming a broadcast dub version in May 2015.

==== Film ====
An animated film by Kyoto Animation titled The Disappearance of Haruhi Suzumiya (涼宮ハルヒの消失, Suzumiya Haruhi no Shōshitsu) was adapted from the Haruhi Suzumiya light novel of the same name and released in Japanese theaters on February 6, 2010. It was announced via a teaser shown at the end of the 2009 re-airing of the anime. This film has also been licensed by Bandai Entertainment, who released it for the North American market on September 20, 2011.

=== Audio dramas ===
A series of radio dramas have been released. The first volume, titled SOS Dan Radio Shibu Bangai Hen CD Vol.1, is based on the anime version of the series and was released on July 5, 2006, by Lantis. The second volume was released on September 21, 2006, while a third was released on December 21, 2006. A drama CD titled Sound Around, based on the anime adaptation, was released on January 24, 2007, by Lantis.

=== Video games ===
Six video games have been produced based on the series. Namco Bandai Games released an adventure game, The Promise of Haruhi Suzumiya (涼宮ハルヒの約束, Suzumiya Haruhi no Yakusoku), for the PlayStation Portable (PSP) on December 20, 2007. Banpresto released another adventure game available for the PlayStation 2 on January 31, 2008, called The Perplexity of Haruhi Suzumiya (涼宮ハルヒの戸惑, Suzumiya Haruhi no Tomadoi). It was the 95th best-selling game in Japan in 2008, selling 139,425 copies.

The third game was developed by Kadokawa Shoten for the Wii, The Excitement of Haruhi Suzumiya (涼宮ハルヒの激動, Suzumiya Haruhi no Gekidō). It was released on January 22, 2009. The fourth game, published by Sega for the Wii, was The Parallel of Haruhi Suzumiya (涼宮ハルヒの並列, Suzumiya Haruhi no Heiretsu). It was released on March 26, 2009, with the fifth game (The Series of Haruhi Suzumiya (涼宮ハルヒの直列, Suzumiya Haruhi no Chokuretsu)), also by Sega, released for the Nintendo DS on May 28, 2009. In February 2010 Kadokawa Shoten released The Day of Sagittarius III in Japanese and English in Apple's App Store.

Namco Bandai Games released a video game for the PlayStation 3 (PS3) and PSP titled The Reminiscence of Haruhi Suzumiya (涼宮ハルヒの追想, Suzumiya Haruhi no Tsuisō) on May 12, 2011. The game is a sequel to The Disappearance of Haruhi Suzumiya, taking place shortly afterward. The PS3 and PSP versions sold a combined 33,784 copies in their first four days of sales. Characters from the Haruhi Suzumiya series also appear in the crossover PSP video game, Nendoroid Generation, by Namco Bandai Games, Good Smile Company and Banpresto.

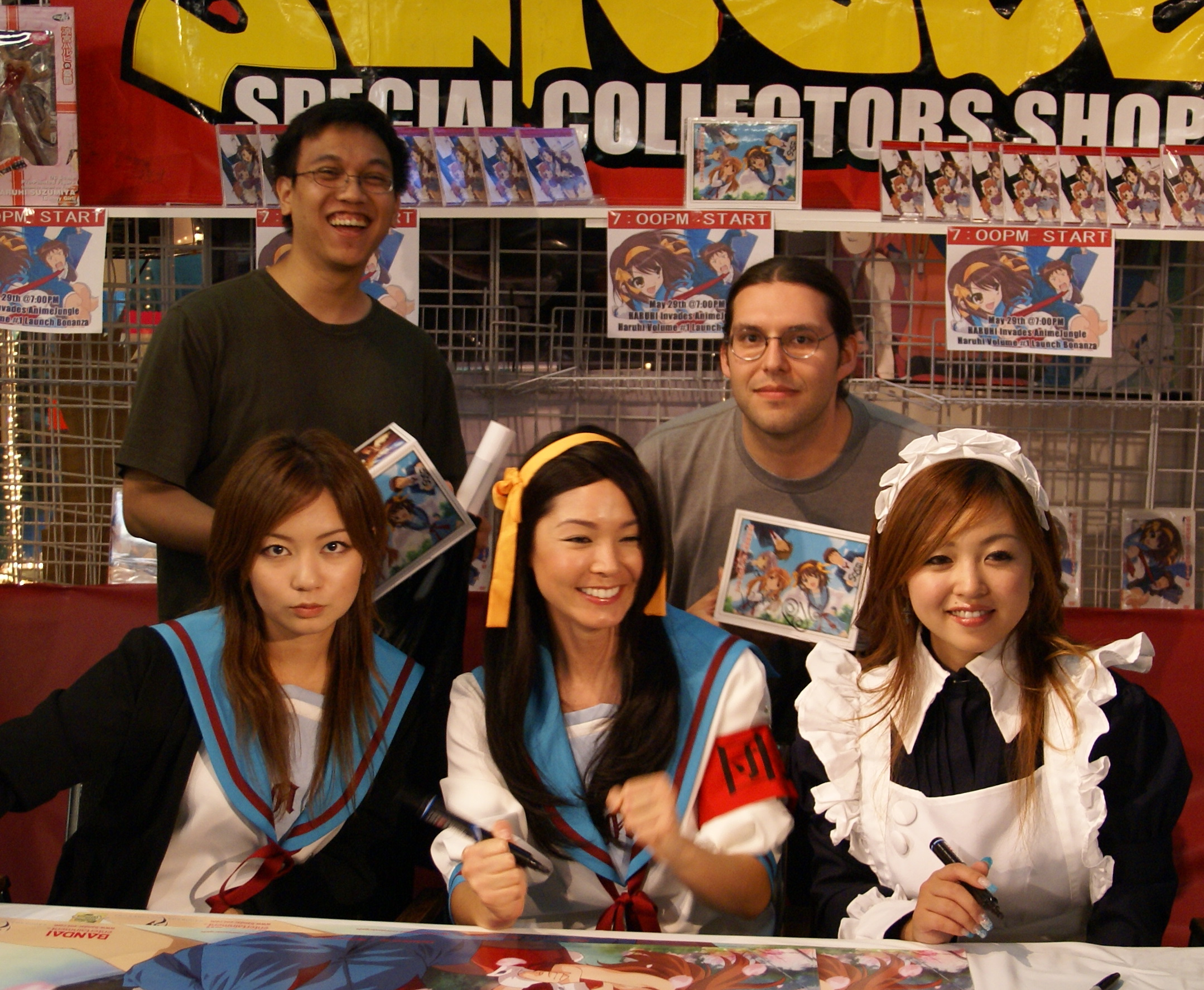
The cast of the first season of live-action promotional videos in 2006

=== ASOS Brigade ===
In December 2006, Bandai Entertainment registered the website asosbrigade.com. On December 22, 2006, the website opened with a live action presentation video resembling a fan-made production featuring Haruka Inoue and Akiyo Yamamoto in the roles of Mikuru Asahina and Yuki Nagato, with Haruhi Suzumiya being played by Patricia Ja Lee. The video (in Japanese) confirmed the specifics of the licensing arrangement. After a few days a subtitled version of the video replaced the original on the site, translating the Japanese licensing announcement into English. The website linked to a blog on the social networking website MySpace, which entered the list of the top 50 most viewed MySpace pages within 24 hours.

On May 30, 2007, the SOS Brigade Invasion Tour was announced for Anime Expo 2007 on June 30. Aya Hirano, Yuko Goto, and Minori Chihara were part of this event "being flown in directly from Japan". Anime Expo attendees were able to participate in the ASOS Dance Contest held on Friday and the winner would have the chance to dance on stage with the guests of honor. Ever since the event was announced, advance ticket sales for pre-registered attendees have caused AX officials to cut down on the number of tickets sold due to the overwhelming number of advance tickets sold (despite the event being free of charge to attend).

In 2010, a new set of videos were introduced to announce the second season of English dubbed episodes. These featured Cristina Vee in the role of Haruhi, Karrie Shirou in the role of Mikuru, and Gina Lee (episode 1) / Alice in the role of Yuki.

== Music ==
The 2006 anime has two opening themes: "The Mikuru Legend of Love" (恋のミクル伝説, "Koi no Mikuru Densetsu"), performed by Yuko Goto and used as the opening of episode one (sometimes called episode zero), and "It's an Adventure, Right? Right?" (冒険でしょでしょ?, "Bōken Desho Desho?") performed by Aya Hirano and used in episodes two through fourteen. The main ending theme of the series was "Hare Hare Yukai" (ハレ晴レユカイ; lit. "Sunny Sunny Delight") performed by Aya Hirano, Minori Chihara and Goto which spanned the first thirteen episodes, with the fourteenth episode ending with an extended version of "It's an Adventure, Right? Right?". For the new episodes of the 2009 re-airing, the opening theme is "Super Driver" by Hirano, and the ending theme is "Stop!" (止マレ!, "Tomare!") performed by Hirano, Chihara and Goto. The single for "Super Driver" was released on July 22, 2009, while the single for "Stop!" was released on August 26, 2009. "It's an Adventure, Right? Right?" was used as the opening theme of the film The Disappearance of Haruhi Suzumiya. The film's theme song is "Yasashii Bōkyaku" (優しい忘却; lit. 'Tender Oblivion') by Chihara.

Among the insert songs used were "God Knows..." and "Lost My Music" performed by Haruhi Suzumiya (Aya Hirano / Wendee Lee) in episode twelve. Segments of Symphony No. 4 in F Minor composed by Pyotr Ilyich Tchaikovsky, Symphony No. 7 in C Major, "Leningrad" composed by Dmitri Shostakovich, and Daphnis et Chloé composed by Maurice Ravel were used in episode eleven, while Symphony No. 8 in E♭ Major, "Symphony of a Thousand", composed by Gustav Mahler, was used in episode fourteen.

"Suzumiya Haruhi no Gekisō" (涼宮ハルヒの激奏, "The Extravagance of Haruhi Suzumiya") was a live concert event held at Omiya Sonic City on March 18, 2007, that featured songs from the anime sung by the voice actors, which was also featured in episode 15 of Lucky Star. The DVD of the concert was released on July 27, 2007. On April 29, 2009, Suzumiya Haruhi no Gensō (涼宮ハルヒの弦奏, The Symphony of Haruhi Suzumiya) was held in Tokyo with music by the Tokyo Philharmonic Orchestra and Philip Chu as conductor. The event featured songs and background music from the anime arranged with a classic twist. A CD of the concert was released on June 24, 2009.

The main theme song for the spin-off ONA series, "The Melancholy of Haruhi-chan Suzumiya" is "Ima Made no Arasuji" (いままでのあらすじ; "A Summary of the Story Up to Now") while the ending theme is "Atogaki no Yō na Mono" (あとがきのようなもの; "Something Like an Afterword"), both performed by Aya Hirano, Minori Chihara, Yuko Goto, Tomokazu Sugita and Daisuke Ono. A single of the two songs was released on April 20, 2009. Three singles accompanying the other spin-off ONA series, Nyoro-n Churuya-san, were released, featuring songs sung by Yuki Matsuoka.

== Reception ==
=== Sales and popularity ===
The first novel of the series, titled The Melancholy of Haruhi Suzumiya, was awarded the Grand Prize in the eighth annual Sneaker Awards—only the third Grand Prize given out in the Award's history. The series has become a success in Japan, selling over 4,300,000 copies in September 2007 and surpassing 8,000,000 copies when the tenth and eleventh volumes were released in May 2011 after the limited editions set a record 513,000 first pressing. As of 2017, 20 million copies of all versions of the light novels and manga volumes internationally are in print.

According to Newtype USA, the light novels' anime adaptation was the most popular anime series in Japan in December 2006. A 2006 online poll of Japan's top 100 favorite anime, conducted by TV Asahi, placed the series in fourth place. The first two DVD volumes had sold 70,000 and 90,000 units respectively as of August 2006, and by the end of 2007, the seventh installment of the series had sold 45,000 units.

=== Accolades ===
The anime placed fifth in IGN's "Top Ten Anime of 2007" feature. The anime won the Animation Kobe Award for TV Feature in 2006. At the Sixth Annual Tokyo Anime Awards, the series won the "Best TV Anime Series" award and Aya Hirano won the "Voice Acting Award." The series' spin-offs, The Melancholy of Haruhi-chan Suzumiya and Nyorōn Churuya-san, won the Network award at the 14th Animation Kobe Awards.

At Anime Expo 2008, the series received several awards by the Society for the Promotion of Japanese Animation. Sugita won an award for Best Voice Actor (Japanese), Hirano for Best Voice Actress (Japanese), Kaeko Sakamoto for Best Casting Director, Shoko Ikeda for Best Character Design, Haruhi Suzumiya for Best Character Design, and "Hare Hare Yukai" for Best Original Song.

=== Cultural impact ===
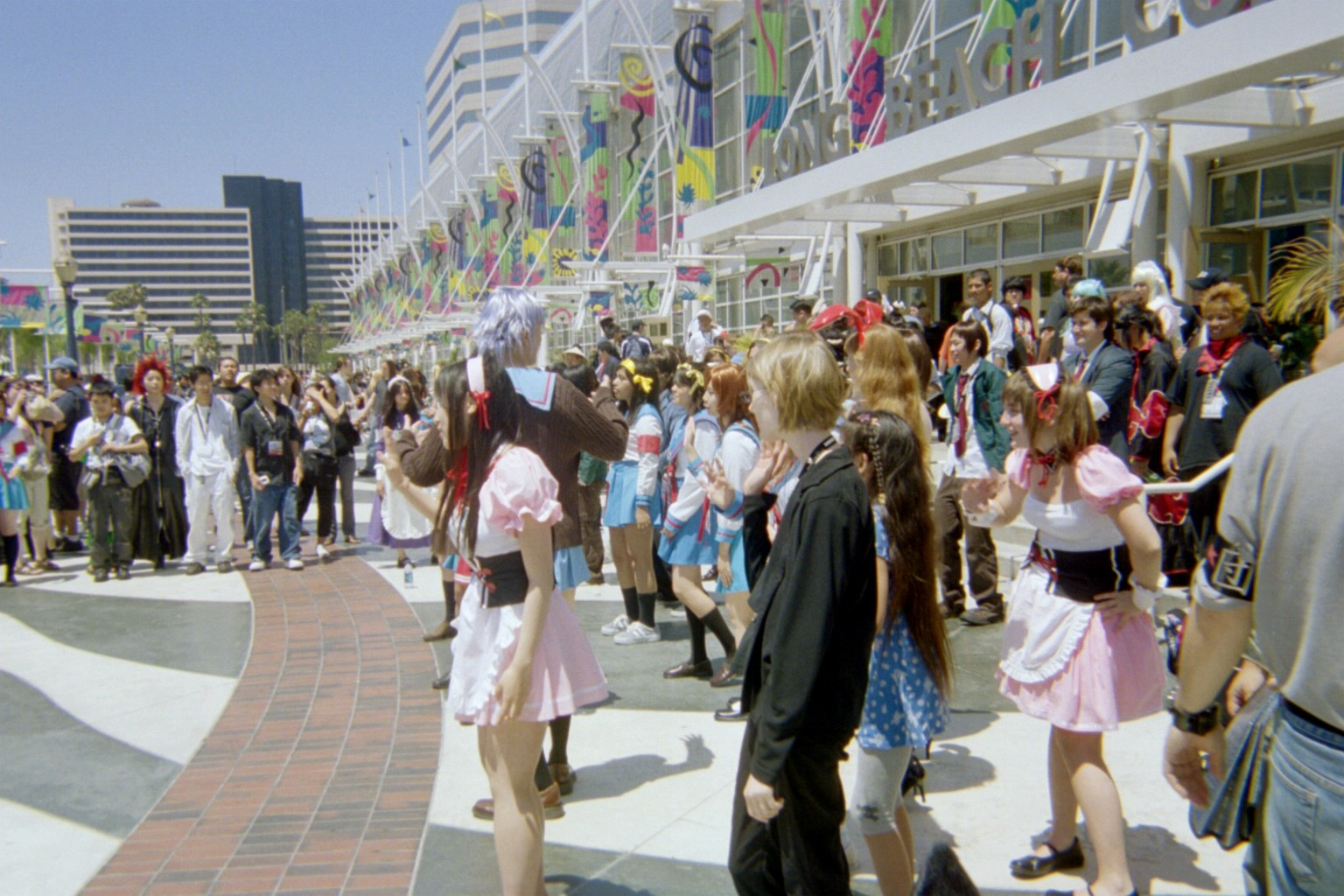
Fans performing the "Hare Hare Yukai" dance at Anime Expo 2007

The anime series became an Internet phenomenon in Japan, Asia, and English-speaking countries. Over 2,000 clips of the series and user-created parodies and homages were posted to video sharing websites such as YouTube and the Japanese video-sharing website Nico Nico Douga.

One particular homage is the recreation of the dance choreography in the ending animation of the theme song, "Hare Hare Yukai", which generated so much public interest that it was credited for establishing the cover dance genre on Nico Nico Douga and YouTube. The popularity of these clips (and those of other popular Japanese series) led the Japanese Society for Rights of Authors, Composers and Publishers (JASRAC) to request that YouTube remove clips claimed to be under the copyright of their members. Business journalist Tadashi Sudo attributed the anime series' success towards coming out during a time when the Internet streaming market was new and being able to take advantage of it. An example described was how Nico Nico Douga was established around the same time the anime series debuted, with the two being able to capitalize off each other's success.

The popularity of the series made Aya Hirano one of the earliest examples of the "idol voice actor" crossover in the late 2000s. Haruhi, Yuki, and Mikuru (voiced by Aya Hirano, Minori Chihara, and Yūko Gotō), along with Japanese drama actor Toma Ikuta, made their first Japanese ad appearance in promoting Lotte Acuo Gum in March 2010. The manga series Lucky Star makes numerous references to the series. The insert song "God Knows..." has shown up in other shows, such as episode five of Remake Our Life!.

The non-chronological broadcast order of the anime inspired a math problem: "What is the fewest number of Haruhi episodes that one would have to watch in order to see the original 14 episodes in every order possible?" In 2011, efforts to solve "The Haruhi Problem" on 4chan led to a proof of the lower bound for the minimal length of superpermutations, solving what had been an open math problem since 1993.
