= Free variation =

Phonetic varieties not affecting meaning

In linguistics, free variation is the phenomenon of two (or more) sounds or forms appearing in the same environment without a change in meaning and without being considered incorrect by native speakers.

Sociolinguists argue that describing such variation as "free" is very often a misnomer, since variation between linguistic forms is usually constrained probabilistically by a range of systematic social and linguistic factors, not unconstrained as the term "free variation" suggests. The term remains in use, however, in studies focused primarily on language as systems (e.g. phonology, morphology, syntax).

== Effects ==
When phonemes are in free variation, speakers are sometimes strongly aware of the fact (especially if such variation is noticeable only across a dialectal or sociolectal divide), and will note, for example, that tomato is pronounced differently in British and American English (/təˈmɑːtoʊ/ and /təˈmeɪtoʊ/ respectively), or that either has two pronunciations that are distributed fairly randomly. However, only a very small proportion of English words show such variations. In the case of different realizations of the same phoneme, however, free variation is exceedingly common and, along with differing intonation patterns, variation in realization is the most important single feature in the characterization of regional accents.

English's deep orthography and the language's wide variety of accents often cause confusion, even for native speakers, on how written words should be pronounced. That allows for a significant degree of free variation to occur in English.

== English examples ==
=== Phonology ===
- The rhotic consonant /r/ is in a free variation between the alveolar approximant, retroflex approximant, alveolar flap and alveolar trill, although all but the first one are considered dialectal and rare.
- Glottalization of voiceless stops in word-final position: for example, the word stop may be pronounced with a plain unaspirated [p], [stɑp], or with a glottalized [pˀ], [stɑpˀ], also called a glottal stop or glottal plosive.

=== Pronunciation ===
Pronunciation of many English words may vary depending on the dialect and the speaker. Although individual speakers may prefer one or the other pronunciation and one may be more common in some dialects than others, many forms can often be encountered within a single dialect and sometimes even within a single idiolect.

- In some words, some speakers might use a different vowel than the others. This includes words like:
  - economics, which may pronounced with /iː/ or /ɛ/ in the first syllable, or data, which can be pronounced as either /ˈdætə/ or /ˈdeɪtə/;
  - either and neither, in which "ei" can be pronounced as either /iː/ or /aɪ/, even by the same speaker;
  - some loanwords, especially of French and Latin origin, such as route, which can be pronounced as either /raʊt/ (a more anglicized pronunciation) or /ruːt/ (a pronunciation more akin to French);
  - some proper names, especially geographic state names such as Colorado, which can be pronounced as either /ˌkɒləˈrɑːdoʊ/ or /ˌkɒləˈrædoʊ/.
- Pronouncing a word with a different consonant or using a completely different pronunciation is also sometimes found in English. This can be found in words like:
  - schedule, which may be pronounced either with the /sk/ consonant cluster or the /ʃ/ sound. The former is more common in American English, the latter in British English; with /sk/ and /ʃ/ phonemically distinct in both varieties (e.g. scout/shout, skin/shin), identical spelling obscures the fact that different phonological structures underlie the phonetic contrast;
  - some loanwords like guillotine which can be pronounced with either /l/ or /j/.

=== Grammar ===
- Years from 2010 onwards can be expressed in English as either, e.g., two thousand (and) ten or twenty ten.

== See also ==
- Allomorph
- Allophone
- Complementary distribution
- Contrastive distribution
- Phoneme
- Sociolinguistics
- Variable rules analysis
