= Linguistic marketplace =

Economic notion in sociolinguistics

In sociolinguistics, the notion of linguistic marketplace, also known as linguistic market or talk market, refers to the symbolic market where linguistic exchanges happen.

On linguistic markets, linguistic capital—a subtype of the broader concept of cultural capital according to Pierre Bourdieu—is exchanged, and different languages and varieties have different symbolic values. Different linguistic varieties are assigned market values and various prices that are either positive or negative. Much of these values is based on connotation for the linguistic variety. The highest market values are assigned to varieties that are rare and desirable in the marketplace. The highest of these is considered legitimate speech. This desire for legitimate speech stems from the education system because it is closely connected to economic growth which relates economic markets to linguistic ones because society converts desirable careers to desirable speech.

Linguistic exchange exists on three main levels:

1. Between the audience and the text
2. Within the content of the text
3. Between texts found in a common group

On the standard linguistic market, standard languages usually enjoy more value due to the high overt prestige associated with them while on linguistic markets that value non-standard varieties, vernaculars can also enjoy a higher value. This concept has been proven to be useful in understanding other sociolinguistic concepts such as language variation and change and gender.

Society at large is considered to be the macro-market for language application, however within society exist several micro-markets. Examples of micro-markets include families and peer groups. Values in micro-markets can vary significantly from the value in the macro-market for a particular variety. For example, many youth may use slang or other language that is particular to a peer group; in that micro-market, that language has a high-market value, however, in the macro-market of society this language value is much lower.

Many researchers have attempted to create new indices to represent the economic parallel that exists within the field of linguistics. David Sankoff and Suzanne Laberge developed an index to specifically measure how speakers' activity within the linguistic market is related to the speakers' knowledge or application of the legitimate speech for the market.
