= Complementary distribution =

Linguistic elements never occurring in the same context

In linguistics, complementary distribution (as distinct from contrastive distribution and free variation) is the relationship between two different elements of the same kind in which one element is found in one set of environments and the other element is found in a non-intersecting (complementary) set of environments.

The term often indicates that two superficially-different elements are the same linguistic unit at a deeper level, though more than two elements can be in complementary distribution with one another.

== In phonology ==
Complementary distribution is the distribution of phones in their respective phonetic environments in which one phone never appears in the same phonetic context as the other. When two variants are in complementary distribution, one can predict when each will occur because one can simply look at the environment in which the allophone is occurring.

Complementary distribution is commonly applied to phonology in which similar phones in complementary distribution are usually allophones of the same phoneme. For instance, in English, [p] and [pʰ] are allophones of the phoneme /p/ because they occur in complementary distribution. [pʰ] always occurs when it is the syllable onset and, most likely, when followed by a stressed vowel (as in the word pin). [p] occurs in all other situations (as in the word spin, or in sipping').

There are cases of elements being in complementary distribution but not being considered allophones. For example, English [h] and [ŋ] are in complementary distribution: [h] occurs only at the beginning of a syllable and [ŋ] only at the end. However, because they have so little in common in phonetic terms, they are still considered separate phonemes. This has led some phonologists to propose the jocular phoneme /ꜧ/ in criticism of using complementary distribution alone to determine allophonic or phonemic status.

== In morphology ==
The concept of complementary distribution is applied in the analysis of word forms (morphology). Two different word forms (allomorphs) can actually be different "faces" of one and the same word (morpheme). An example is the English indefinite articles a and an. The usages an aardvark and a bear are grammatical, but the usages *a aardvark and *an bear are ungrammatical (as is marked with "*" in linguistics).

The form an is used before a word that begins with a vowel sound.
That can be notated as "__ V".

The form a is used before a word beginning with a consonant sound.
That can be notated as "__ C".

The "distribution" (usage according to environments) of the forms an and a is "complementary" because of three factors:
(1) an is used if a is not used;
(2) a is used if an is not used;
(3) both environments together cover every legitimate potential environment for the word.

The forms a and an encompass every environment in which the English indefinite article is used, i.e. there are two different "forms" of the same "word" instead of two different words.

== See also ==
- Contrastive distribution
- Distributionalism
- Free variation
- Minimal pair
- Phoneme
