= Altima Ace =

Manga magazine

- Issue #3 (March 2012) cover illustrating The Case Files of Biblia Bookstore
- Categories: Shōjo
- Frequency: Bimonthly
- Publisher: Kadokawa Shoten
- First issue: October 18, 2011
- Final issue: October 18, 2012
- Country: Japan
- Based in: Tokyo
- Language: Japanese
- Website: Official site (in Japanese)

Altima Ace (アルティマエース), also known as AltimaA, and subtitled "Ultimate Magazine that you are crazy about," is a defunct Japanese manga magazine published by Kadokawa Shoten. Altima Ace was a spinoff sister magazine to Kadokawa Shoten's Young Ace. The first issue was released on October 18, 2011, and was scheduled to publish bimonthly in Japan on the 18th day of even-numbered months, priced at 580 yen.

On October 18, 2012, after a one-year run, Kadakowa announced that it was ending publication of Altima Ace with the November 2012 issue. A total of seven bimonthly issues were published in all. Five of its continuing manga stories were moved to Monthly Asuka, including The Case Files of Biblia Bookstore and Fate/Zero Kuro, and an additional three titles were to be transferred to Young Ace.

== Serialized manga ==
- Bakudan Handan by Otomate and Yamaguch Kyounosuke
- Kami-sama☆Permanent by Jinsei Kataoka and Kazuma Kondou
- The Case Files of Biblia Bookstore (Biblia Used Bookstore Casebook) (ビブリア古書堂の事件手帖) by Nakano, based on the light novels by En Mikami
- Baka ga Zenra de Yattekuru by Hiroto Ida
- Busta! by Eiri Iwamoto
- The Intrigues of Koizumi Itsuki-kun by Puyo
- Mahou Shounen no Sodatekata by Yuu Mori
- Fate/Zero Kuro by mendori
- Kangaero by Mayu Taumi
