= National Statistical Office of Papua New Guinea =

Data collection institute of Papua New Guinea

The National Statistical Office of Papua New Guinea is a national institute of Papua New Guinea, which is dedicated to collecting socioeconomic data in the country. It collects data on demographics, population, climatology, industry, tourism, education and employment. John Igitoi has been the acting National Statistician since 2019.

== History ==
The National Statistical Office was established in 1981 via passage of the Statistical Service Act. The government of Papua New Guinea created the institute with a mandate of collecting official statistics for policy and planning at the national level. PNG's Public Service Commission staffed the National Statistics Office with 135 positions in 1983. The 1995 Reformed Organic Law on Provincial and Local Level Government empowered the institute to begin collecting data at the provincial and local level. A 1999 restructuring reduced the number of staff to 106 and strengthened focus on the country's 2000 census.
