= Harold S. Stone =

American computer scientist

Harold Stuart Stone (born August 10, 1938 in St. Louis, Missouri) is an American computer scientist specializing in parallel computer architecture. He is an IEEE Fellow, and a Fellow of the Association for Computing Machinery (1994).

== Education and career ==
Stone obtained a bachelor in Electrical Engineering at Princeton University in 1960, and his masters and PhD in 1961 and 1963 at the University of California, Berkeley. His PhD advisors were Robert B. Ash and Eugene Wong. He was a faculty member at Stanford University from 1968 until 1974, when he moved to the University of Massachusetts Amherst. From 1984 onwards was he a researcher at IBM's Thomas J. Watson Research Center and later as a NEC Fellow at the NEC Research Institute in Princeton, New Jersey.

== Books ==
Stone's books include:

- High Performance Computer Architecture, Addison-Wesley 1987, 2. Edition 1993
- Introduction to Computer Architecture, 1975, 2. Edition, Chicago: Science Research Associates 1980
- Introduction to Computer Organization and Data Structures, McGraw Hill 1971
- Discrete mathematical structures and their applications, Chicago: Science Research Associates 1973
- Microcomputer Interfacing, Addison-Wesley 1982
- with Daniel Siewiorek Introduction to computer organization and data structures, PDP-11 edition, McGraw Hill 1975

== Recognition ==
Stone received the IEEE Emanuel R. Piore Award in 1992, the Taylor L. Booth Award in 1999, and the Charles Babbage Award in 1991. He is IEEE Fellow and Fellow of the Association for Computing Machinery (1993).
