= Bellevue Investments =

German holding company

Bellevue Investments GmbH & Co. KGaA
- Type: GmbH & Co. KGaA
- ISIN: DE0007220782
- Industry: Investment holding
- Founded: 1993
- Headquarters: Berlin, Germany
- Website: www.bellevue.eu

Bellevue Investments GmbH & Co. KGaA is a German holding company that controls numerous subsidiaries and investments domestically and abroad. The subsidiaries have different business models and are active in the fields of software, online services, entertainment and digital content, as well as real estate. The subsidiaries currently employ approximately 350 people.

== History ==
The company was founded in 1993 in Munich by Jürgen Jaron Dieter Rein and Erhard Rein. In 1998 two software developers from Dresden, Tilman Herberger and Titus Tost, joined the company. The headquarters was moved to Berlin in the same year. In 2001 the company changed its business type from a GmbH ("Gesellschaft mit beschränkter Haftung", English: company with limited liability) to Magix AG ("Aktiengesellschaft", English: stock corporation). Magix AG went public on April 6, 2006. Its stocks were listed on the official market and the Prime Standard of the Frankfurt Stock Exchange. After switching to the Entry Standard in 2012, Magix AG filed an application in May 2014 to have the license to trade its shares on the unofficial market revoked and its stocks delisted on November 30, 2014. In 2015 the company changed its business type to MAGIX GmbH & Co. KGaA. In 2016 the name of the company was changed to Bellevue Investments.

== Subsidiaries of Bellevue Investments GmbH & Co. KGaA ==
=== Magix Software GmbH ===
Magix Software GmbH, an international software publisher with a focus on multimedia software and services, is the largest subsidiary of Magix GmbH & Co. KGaA. The company is headquartered in Berlin, Germany with additional locations in Dresden and Lübbecke in Germany, Bologna in Italy, Boulogne in France, Huizen in The Netherlands, Hemel Hempstead in the United Kingdom, Markham in Canada, and Reno in the United States.

=== Magix Online Services GmbH ===
The subsidiary Magix Online Services GmbH has been offering online services, such as Magix Online Album and Magix Website Maker, since 2004. Magix Web Designer, a program for creating websites, was introduced in 2009.

Products

Web
Web Designer
Website Maker
Online Album

=== Xara Group Ltd. ===
Bellevue Investments acquired the English company Xara Group Ltd, headquartered in Hemel Hempstead, in 2007. Xara produces graphics software and Web design programs. The company is first and foremost known for Xara Designer Pro, which is available in its 10th version (as of September 2014).

The company was founded in 1981 and began developing for various systems, such as the Atari ST, BBC Micro and Acorn Archimedes, and also developed ArtWorks, the predecessor to Xara Xtreme. In 1996 Xara began developing for Windows, leading to the development of Xara 3D, Xara X and Xara Xtreme, the predecessors to the Magix products Xara 3D Maker, Xara Photo & Graphic Designer and Xara Designer Pro.

Xara Web Designer, a program for creating websites, was first released in 2009. In 2013 Xara Page & Layout Designer, a DTP program, was added to the product range.

=== mufin GmbH ===
mufin (pronounced muffin) stands for "music finder". Bellevue Investments acquired full ownership of mufin GmbH in 2007. In 2005 Bellevue Investments acquired 66% of m2any GmbH in Garching. The company changed its name to mufin GmbH and moved its headquarters to Berlin following full acquisition by Bellevue Investments. m2any GmbH is the result of a research project run by the Fraunhofer Institute for Integrated Circuits, the inventor of the MP3 format.

mufin technology is based on AudioID, an acoustic fingerprint, which enables the quick recognition of music and audio signals. AudioID is an element of the MPEG-7 standard.

In addition to music recognition, mufin is also active in the area of "automatic content recognition", which can be built into second screen applications as a service.

=== Catooh Corp./Appic Labs Corp. ===
Bellevue Investments founded the limited company Catooh Corp. in Las Vegas, Nevada in 2007. The company was registered in the commercial register on April 5, 2007. Catooh Corp. served to handle all transactions from the online digital media marketplace, "Catooh". In 2013 the company was renamed Appic Labs Corp. All transactions through the online service "Catooh" are now handled by Magix Computer Products International Corp., whereas Appic Labs is responsible for the development and marketing of mobile camera and photo applications.

=== JAM just add musicExpert Systems GmbH ===
The company was founded as Open Seminar GmbH in 2011. The company operates the online portal provenexpert.com, a platform for word of mouth marketing and customer satisfaction analysis.

=== simplitec GmbH ===
simplitec GmbH is an international provider of utility software. The current simplitec product range includes simplifast, simpliclean and simplisafe, all of which are contained in a yearly subscription to the simplitec Power Suite.

=== Bellevue Property GmbH ===
Bellevue Property GmbH is a real estate development company with assets located in Dresden and Berlin.

=== Overview of subsidiaries ===
The following entities are full subsidiaries of the MAGIX Group (as of September 30, 2013):

- APPIC LABS Corp., Las Vegas, Nevada, United States
- APPIC LABS GmbH, Berlin, Germany
- Bellevue Property GmbH, Zossen, Germany
- MAGIX Audio GmbH, Berlin, Germany
- MAGIX Computer Products International Corp. Reno, Nevada, USA
- MAGIX Entertainment S.A.R.L. Paris, France
- MAGIX AG Canada
- MAGIX Entertainment S.R.L. Bolzano, Italy
- MAGIX Entertainment B.V. Huizen, Netherlands
- MAGIX Limited Hemel Hempstead, Hertfordshire, United Kingdom
- MAGIX Limited Taipei, Taiwan
- MAGIX Online Services GmbH Berlin, Germany
- MAGIX Software GmbH Berlin, Germany
- myGOYA GmbH, Zossen, Germany
- mufin GmbH Berlin, Germany
- Expert Systems AG Berlin, Germany
- simplitec GmbH Berlin, Germany
- The Xara Group Ltd. Basingstoke, Hampshire, United Kingdom

== See also ==
- List of music software
- Automatic content recognition
