= Audible Magic =

American digital rights company

Audible Magic Corporation
- Type: Private
- Industry: automatic content recognition, audio and video fingerprinting, cover identification, music recognition, TV and movie recognition, content fulfillment and rights administration for music
- Founded: 1999
- Founders: Vance Ikezoye, Jim Schrempp
- Headquarters: Los Gatos, California, United States
- Products: copyright compliance services, UGC licensing and monetization services, rights administration, content fulfillment for music, registration services
- Website: audiblemagic.com

Audible Magic Corporation (commonly Audible Magic) is a Los Gatos, California-based company that provides content identification services to social networks, record labels, music publishers, television studios, and movie studios. The company also provides digital platform music management services for Internet radio, subscription music services, on-demand streaming, and fitness and gaming applications. The services help companies identify and protect copyrighted content, manage rights and monetize media.

== History ==
=== 1999-2002 ===
Audible Magic was founded in 1999 by Vance Ikezoye and Jim Schrempp. Their original goal was to create a service where radio listeners could call a number to identify a song that was playing and purchase it. Instead of using metadata and other digital descriptors, the company found a way to use the digital signature of the song itself to track and identify it.

In October 2000, Audible Magic acquired MuscleFish LLC, a developer of sound similarity and audio classification technologies.

In 2001, the company partnered with streaming audience size and demographics tracking company MeasureCast to provide the first verification and demographic reporting service for online advertisements.

In October 2002, Audible Magic signed a deal with its first major label, British music conglomerate EMI Recorded Music to use Audible Magic's audio fingerprinting technology to track licensed and unlicensed usage of EMI's song catalog.

=== 2003-2007 ===
In February 2003, the company announced the deployment of a new automated radio ad monitoring system for AM and FM radio stations across the country by New York City-based media monitoring company Video Monitoring Services of America (VMS). In October, Audible Magic signed a deal with Sony Music for Audible Magic's CopySense application, to block pirated content and pornography from being traded on peer-to-peer networks.

In October 2004, the company launched RepliCheck, an anti-piracy information system that identifies the title, artist, releasing label and copyright date of individual songs to curb the mass production of pirated CDs. The company signed deals with five CD manufacturers, which in turn marketed the service to music labels and independent artists.

In February 2007, the social networking site Myspace launched a pilot program to block videos containing unauthorized copyrighted content from being posted in its community. The company licensed digital fingerprinting technology from Audible Magic and became the largest Internet video site to offer free video filtering to copyright holders.

=== 2008-2017 ===
In 2012, Audible Magic launched Audini, a browser plug-in for automatic content recognition (ACR) services.

In May 2014, Vimeo partnered with Audible Magic to launch Vimeo's Copyright Match feature to automatically flag uploaded videos that violates copyrights. In August, the company partnered with video game-streaming company Twitch to scan the site's videos-on-demand in order to identify and mute videos in which it detects copyrighted audio material.

In August 2017, Audible Magic was awarded an Emmy Award for Technology and Engineering by the National Academy of Television Arts and Sciences, for its video ID technology to protect copyrighted content.

=== 2018 to present ===
In February 2019, Audible Magic launched two services RightsAudit and RightsRX, designed to verify music rights ownership. Sony-owned The Orchard was among the first customers to use the new services. In April, Audible Magic Corporation partnered with online music distributor CD Baby to prevent copyrighted tracks from being uploaded to its service prior to delivery to a Digital Service Provider (DSP). In June, Audible Magic partnered with digital distribution service DistroKid to prevent fraudulent artists from stealing and uploading unreleased original content. In September, the company launched its UGC Music Rights Platform (UMRP), to help companies license and administer music rights for user- generated content (UGC) on social media.

In January 2021, Audible Magic acquired B2B digital music platform MediaNet from Canadian performance rights organization Society of Composers, Authors and Music Publishers of Canada (SOCAN).
