= Vizio =

American consumer electronics company

Vizio, Inc.
- Formerly: V Inc. (2002–2004)
- Type: Subsidiary
- Industry: Electronics
- Founded: October 2002; 24 years ago, in Costa Mesa, California, U.S.
- Founders: William Wang
- Headquarters: Irvine, California, U.S.
- Area served: North America
- Key people: William Wang (CEO); Ben Wong (President & COO); Adam Townsend (CFO); Mike O'Donnell (Chief Revenue Officer, Platform+)
- Products: OLED TV, 4K UHD TVs, LCD TVs, LED TVs, soundbars, home theater in a box, QLED TV, Platform+
- Parent: Walmart (2024–present)
- Website: www.vizio.com

Vizio, Inc. is an American designer of televisions, soundbars, and related software and accessories owned by Walmart since 2024. The company was founded in 2002 and is based in Irvine, California.

== History ==
The company was founded in 2002 as V Inc. by entrepreneur William Wang and two founding employees. By 2004, Wang changed the company name to Vizio. In 2006, the company's revenue was estimated at $700 million, and in 2007 it was estimated to have exceeded $2 billion. Vizio is known for selling its HDTVs at lower prices than its competitors. In late 2014, Vizio acquired Advanced Media Research Group, Inc., the parent of entertainment website BuddyTV.

On July 24, 2015, Vizio filed with U.S. regulators to raise up to $172.5 million in an initial public offering of Class A common stock. In August 2015, Vizio acquired Cognitive Media Networks, Inc, a provider of automatic content recognition (ACR). Cognitive Media Networks was subsequently renamed Inscape Data. Inscape functioned as an independent entity until the end of 2020, when it was combined with Vizio Ads and SmartCast; the three divisions combining to operate as a single unit.

On July 26, 2016, Chinese electronics company LeEco announced that it would acquire Vizio for US$2 billion; however, the acquisition was canceled in April 2017 after the Chinese government blocked the merger amid a larger government crackdown on major foreign acquisition by domestic Chinese firms. Vizio and LeEco settled a lawsuit regarding payment of the breakup fee. In 2018, Vizio launched a free streaming service called WatchFree, powered by Pluto TV, on its SmartCast platform. As of 2020, Vizio was the second largest seller of flat-panel display televisions in the US. By March 2021, the company sold over 11 million soundbars and 80 million TVs, and has more than 12 million active SmartCast accounts. In March 2021, Vizio became a public company via an initial public offering. Effective December 2021, Bill Baxter resigned as chief technology officer.

In February 2024, retailer corporation Walmart announced plans to acquire VIZIO Holding Corp. for $2.3 billion. Following regulatory approval, the transaction was completed on December 3 with VIZIO Holding Corp. and Vizio, Inc. becoming wholly owned subsidiaries. The acquisition enables Walmart to "shore up its advertising business and create a more potent rival to Amazon’s booming ad business." By July 2025, Bloomberg News reported that Walmart was ending sales of Vizio products at Amazon.com and Best Buy as part of a larger plan to transition Vizio into a private label brand available only at Walmart or Sam's Club locations by the end of 2025.

== Products ==
Vizio manufactures its products in Mexico, China, and Vietnam under agreements with ODM assemblers.

=== Televisions ===
Televisions are Vizio's primary product category, and in 2007 the company became the largest LCD TV seller (by volume) in North America. In February 2009, Vizio announced they would stop production of plasma televisions and would focus on the LED-backlit LCD displays.

In March 2016, Vizio announced the release of SmartCast TVs that allowed users to control the screen from a tablet or mobile app. The following year, Vizio relaunched its smart TV platform to include apps directly on the screen, including Amazon Prime Video and Netflix.

In 2018, Vizio released its first Quantum Dot LED 4K TV. Vizio has added functionality for Google Assistant and Alexa-enabled devices, Apple AirPlay 2, Apple HomeKit and gaming features for its SmartCast TVs.

- D-Series: Full-HD TV
- V-Series: Smart TV. The V- and D- series come in sizes from 24 to 75 inches and use direct LED backlight.
- M-Series Quantum: HDR TV. The 2022 models have local dimming up to 32 zones, and come in sizes from 43 to 75 inches. They are LCD TVs with 4K resolution and standard HDMI 2.0 that support AMD FreeSync.
- P-Series Quantum: The 2022 models can reach up to 1200 nits peak brightness.
- P-Series Quantum X: Smart TV. The 2022 models have dimming with 792 zones in the 85-inch model, reaching 3000 nits peak brightness.
- OLED TV: In 2020, Vizio released its first OLED TV. The Vizio OLED uses IQ Ultra image processor and supports VRR up to 120Hz.

=== Sound bars ===
Vizio's sound bar products are named by series, including the V-Series, M-Series, and Elevate. Series names pair with suggested TV products.

In 2013, Vizio released the Home Theater Sound Bar, a surround sound home audio system." In 2018, the company released its first Dolby Atmos soundbars. In 2020, Vizio released the Elevate soundbar, the first Atmos soundbar with rotating speakers. At CES 2020, Vizio earned the CES innovation award product designation for the Elevate sound bar.

Vizio's audio collection includes entry and mid-level sound bars that include surround sound, as well as premium versions.

- V-Series: The V-Series for 2022 supports the standard version of "audio return channel" or ARC. The V51x-J6 has 5.1-channel audio.
- M-Series:Mid-range sound bars. The 2022 model M512a-H6 is a 5.1.2-channel sound bar. It has surround speakers that connect to a wireless sound bar and upfiring drivers have height cues for Dolby Atmos and DTS:X soundtracks, and has eARC support.
- Elevate Series: Motorized height sound bars detect Dolby Atmos and DTS:X signals.

=== Vizio OS ===
Vizio OS, formerly known as SmartCast, is the operating system and platform used by Vizio in all of its smart TVs. It uses both Chromecast and Apple AirPlay. In June 2021, Vizio updated SmartCast with a voice-control feature. The platform provides access to a limited number of streaming services, including Apple TV+, Disney+, Hulu, Netflix and Prime Video.

=== Past products ===
Vizio has previously produced other products in addition to televisions and soundbars. In 2011, Vizio introduced the Via Tablet and Via Phone, its first tablet and mobile phone products. The following year, Vizio began producing laptops, creating a lineup of PC computers that came in ultrabook and notebook models. Also in 2012, Vizio introduced several HD Android smartphones in Asian markets, including China, and began selling the "Vizio Co-Star," a Google TV digital media player. In 2013, the company released the Vizio Tablet PC, its first Windows 8 tablet. The company stopped producing tablets and computers in 2014.

== Legal issues ==
In November 2015, the U.S. Federal Trade Commission (FTC) and Office of the New Jersey Attorney General brought charges against Vizio, alleging it collected non-personal information on its customers and sold it to advertisers. In February 2017, Vizio agreed to pay $2.2 million to settle the charges. The settlement required Vizio to delete the data it had captured and update its data collection practices. After the settlement, the company only collected data from TV units that opted in through disclosures.

In October 2021, Vizio was sued by the Software Freedom Conservancy for violations of the GNU General Public License by failing to provide source code. SFC stated in the lawsuit that Vizio was "not providing and technical information that copyleft licenses require, Vizio was not even informing its customers about copylefted software and the rights it gives them as consumers." On November 29, 2021, Vizio filed a request to remove the case into US federal court. On May 13, 2022, federal district court judge Josephine Staton sided with SFC and granted a motion to send the lawsuit back to Superior Court, to answer breach-of-contract claims. A trial was expected on October 6, 2025 but was changed to January 12, 2026. About an hour before the hearing's start-time Judge Sandy Leal issued a minute order that rescheduled the hearing to a later time because of an older case needed more time for their jury trial. Attorneys for both SFC and Vizio after the minute order were negotiating with the Court for rescheduling. Circa March 2, 2026 the SFC website indicated a "Trial Date: August 10–19, 2026". Later the SFC indicated another change of the trial date to "Trial Date:late 2026" on their website without specifying a date.

== Sponsorships ==
In October 2010, Vizio signed a 4-year contract to sponsor the annual college football Rose Bowl Game in Pasadena, California, beginning with the 2011 Rose Bowl and ending with the 2014 BCS National Championship Game. When the Rose Bowl contract ended, Vizio signed a contract to sponsor the Fiesta Bowl.
