= Search by sound =

Retrieval of information based on audio input

Search by sound is the retrieval of information based on audio input. There are a handful of applications, specifically for mobile devices that utilize search by sound. Shazam, Soundhound, Axwave, ACRCloud and others have seen considerable success by using a simple algorithm to match an acoustic fingerprint to a song in a library. These applications take a sample clip of a song, or a user-generated melody and check a music library/music database to see where the clip matches with the song. From there, song information will be queried and displayed to the user.

These kinds of applications are mainly used for finding a song that the user does not already know. Searching by sound is not limited to just identifying songs, but also for identifying melodies, tunes or advertisements, sound library management and video files.

== Acoustic fingerprinting ==
The way these apps search by sound is through generating an acoustic fingerprint; a digital summary of the sound. A microphone is used to pick up an audio sample, which is then broken down into a simple numeric signature, a code unique to each track. Using the same method of fingerprinting sounds, when Shazam picks up a sound clip, it will generate a signature for that clip. Then it’s simple pattern matching from there using an extensive audio music database.

The practice of using acoustic fingerprints is not limited to just music, however, but other areas of the entertainment business as well. Shazam also can identify television shows with the same technique of acoustic fingerprinting. Of course, this method of breaking down a sound sample into a unique signature is useless unless there is an extensive database of music with keys to match with the samples. Shazam has over 11 million songs in its database.

Other services such as Midomi and Soundhound allow users to add to that library of music in order to expand the chances to match a sound sample with its corresponding sound.

== Query by humming ==
Midomi and Soundhound both offer query by humming. This is a branch off of acoustic fingerprints but is still a musical retrieval system. After receiving a user-generated hummed melody, which is the input query, the system returns a ranked list of songs that are closest to the user query.

== See also ==
- AmpliFIND
- Automatic content recognition
- List of online music databases
- Lostwave
- Music information retrieval
- Sound recognition
