= Jaikoz =

Java tagging program

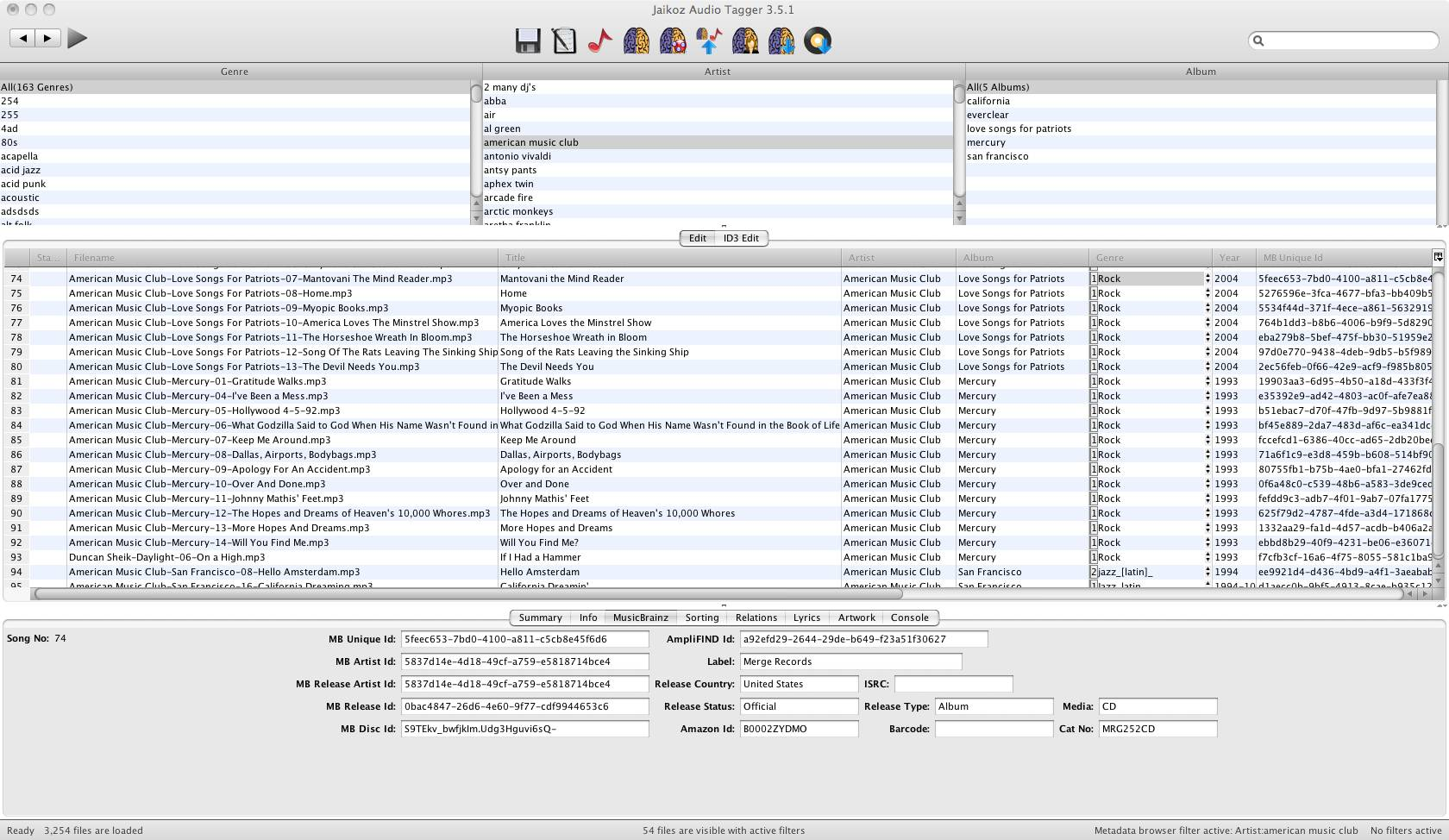
- The main tagging window
- Developer: Jthink
- Stable release: 9.3.0 / 17 October 2017; 8 years ago
- Operating system: Mac OS X, Windows, Linux
- Platform: Java 1.5
- Type: Tag editor, acoustic fingerprinter
- License: Shareware
- Website: jthink.net/jaikoz/

Jaikoz is a Java program used for editing and mass tagging music file tags.

Jaikoz generates acoustic fingerprints from music files using the AcoustID service, it can then look up the metadata from MusicBrainz using the AcoustId, additionally it can match based on metadata to MusicBrainz or Discogs. Matching is first applied at album level, falling back to track level where a match at album level could not be made. This allows Jaikoz to automatically fix most of a users song collection.

Jaikoz uses a relatively unusual spreadsheet metaphor for both viewing and editing data, and allows editing of over fifty fields using this spreadsheet interface, the underlying jaudiotagger tag library is released under LGPL and is used by various Java applications.

Jaikoz is commercially licensed software, written in Java 1.5 by Paul Taylor. A shareware version, in which changes can only be saved to 20 files during one use, is also available as a 30-day free trial. 10% of every sale is paid to the MetaBrainz Foundation to support MusicBrainz development.

== History ==
Originally released in 2006 as a standalone music tagger without any MusicBrainz support, but support for MusicBrainz was soon added. Changes in Jaikoz have always reflected changes in MusicBrainz, for example Jaikoz was the first application to make use of the new web service released as part of the MusicBrainz NGS release in 2011, and the first application to use the MusicBrainz seeding mechanism for adding new releases.

== Summary of features ==
- Acoustic matching using MusicBrainz and AcoustId to match songs based on the actual music
- MetaData matching using MusicBrainz and Discogs to match tracks from the metadata in your files either automatically or manually
- Fixes artwork.
- Supports Multiple Audio formats and different audio formats can be edited the same easy way
- Export/Import metadata to/from a spreadsheet.
- Delete Duplicates based on Musicbrainz Id and/or Acoustic Fingerprint
- Find And Replace feature that can be used to find and replace values in all/any column
- Intelligent FileName to Tagger can extract information from the filename into the tag without having to know the format of the field
- Configure batch operations using AutoCorrect
- Full Unicode support allow any character from any language to be used
- Easy conversion of tags between ID3 versions
- Adding releases to MusicBrainz

== Reviews and awards ==
Jaikoz has been favorably received worldwide. Jaikoz was recommended in a LifeHacker article for automatically correcting your metadata. Jaikoz version 1.1.3 was distributed by Macworld Italy magazine with its Spring, 2006 supplement "Everything iPod". Version 2.5 was favorably reviewed in 2008 by Thomas Weiss, senior editor of Macnews Germany. Macworld Germany editor Matthias Zehden concurred in his 2009 iPhoneWelt review of Jaikoz.

== Academic notice ==
In 2006, Julien Chaveau of the University of Angers cited Jaikoz as an exemplar of an automated information extraction system, and in 2008 Badawia Albassuny of King Abdulaziz University included Jaikoz in his survey of automatic metadata generators for its ability to generate metadata by analyzing content.

== See also ==
- ID3
- List of tag editors
- MusicBrainz
