= DDL =

DDL may refer to:

== Technology ==
- Data definition language or data description language, relating to databases
- Description Definition Language, part of the MPEG-7 standard
- Device Description Language, related to field devices for process and factory automation
- Digital data logger, a type of data logger, an electronic device that records data over time or in relation to location
- Direct download link, hyperlink for file downloads
- Dolby Digital Live, real-time audio compression
- Drop-down list, graphical user interface control element
- An acronym for the Australian light destroyer project

== People ==
- Daniel Day-Lewis, actor

== Businesses ==
- Det Danske Luftfartselskab, Danish airline
- Dutch Defence League, a Dutch offshoot of the English Defence League

== Other ==
- Data-driven learning, an approach to learning foreign languages
- Den Danske Landinspektørforening, the Danish Association of Chartered Surveyors
