= PUID =

PUID may refer to:

- PRONOM's Persistent Unique Identifier, a digital file locator used by The National Archives of the United Kingdom
- Passport Unique Identifier, which is the unique element of a profile in Microsoft's .NET software development kit
- Portable Unique IDentifier, an identifier associated with a MusicDNS acoustic fingerprint
