= Music Story =

Music service website

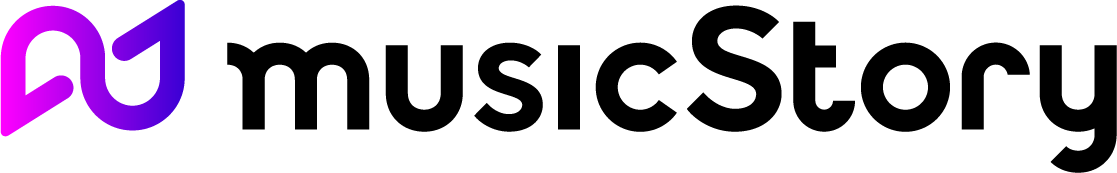
- Website type: Music database
- Available in: English, French, German, Japanese, Korean
- Creators: Jean-Luc Biaulet, Loïc Picaud
- Website: music-story.com
- Commercial: yes
- Launched: 2008
- Current status: Online

Music Story is a music service website and international music data provider. It curates, aggregates and analyzes metadata for digital music services.

== History ==
Music Story was launched in 2008 as an online musical encyclopedia inspired by AllMusic. It was founded by Jean-Luc Biaulet and Loïc Picaud, the last of whom is the site's editor-in-chief and has authored books on David Bowie, Serge Gainsbourg, Paul McCartney and Red Hot Chili Peppers. Picaud also wrote L'Odyssée du Rock Français, a study of French rock music, and contributed to the reference work Le Rock de A à Z.

The site included artists' biographies, features on various musical genres and album reviews. Among the contributors and reviewers were music critic Christian Larrède, who has written for the cultural magazine Les Inrockuptibles; Stan Cuesta, a musician and journalist specialising in rock and folk, who has also contributed to Mojo, Rolling Stone and Rock & Folk; and Guillaume Belhomme, a jazz musician and author.

Music Story later developed as an editorial enrichment service for digital music platforms, such as artist biographies, and processing and qualification of metadata. In 2013, the company launched an application programming interface (API). Titled Music Story Pro, it offers integrated digital music search engines, access to third-party content (audio/video streams, photos, lyrics), and music recommendations. In October 2014, the company's products were featured in Radio 2.0 Paris' music technology event, hosted by Radio France.

In 2015, Music Story carried out a fundraising of €600,000 to further its international development. The initiative was supported by France's Institut pour le Financement du Cinéma et des Industries Culturelles. As of May that year, the company's customers included Deezer, Fnac, Amazon, Radio France, Lagardère and Universal.
