= AudioID =

Commercial technology

AudioID is a commercial technology for automatically identifying audio material using acoustic fingerprints. Audio data is recognized automatically and associated information (track or artist name, for example) is provided in real time. The technology was developed by the Fraunhofer Institute for Digital Media Technology (IDMT). The IDMT is managed by Prof. Karlheinz Brandenburg, who led the development of the MP3 format. AudioID technology is a part of the international ISO/IEC MPEG-7 audio standard of the Moving Picture Experts Group (MPEG). In 2005 German-based company Magix AG acquired patents for the technology. Mufin is a commercial product based on the AudioID.

== Process ==
First, a clear digital signature is created from the output sound, and this is then stored in a database. The signature can be linked to additional meta information in a database, e.g. artist or title information. As soon as an audio signal's signature is available, AudioID can identify a sample of the original audio, even if the sample is only a few seconds long. Alteration of the output sound material, e.g. bias or equalization, MP3 encoding or acoustic transfer does not influence the quality of the recognition process. The rate of recognition normally amounts to 99%.

== Application ==
Audio recognition technologies like AudioID are used everywhere where sound material has to be recognized and identified automatically, e.g. radio or digital libraries. Commercial products which utilize the AudioID technology include diverse MAGIX products, such as MP3 Maker.
