= Tunatic =

Freeware music identification program

Tunatic is a freeware music identification program developed by Sylvain Demongeot for Windows and Mac OS.

The software analyzes a song by recording it via microphone or just by playing it through the sound card, and then it sends the data online to its database where it searches for a match. Tunatic will return the title of the song and the author along with a link for more information if a match is found.

The database is created with information that users can upload with a program called Tunalyzer (available for Mac only).

The website and programs do not appear to have been updated since 2010.
