= Inscape Data Services =

Data service for smart TVs

- Company type: Privately held company
- Industry: Automatic content recognition
- Headquarters: San Francisco, California, United States
- Key people: Zeev Neumeier; Michael Collette; Brian Reed
- Parent: Vizio
- Website: inscape.tv

Inscape is an American provider of automatic content recognition (ACR) services to Smart TV OEMs.

The company was founded in 2009 as TV Interactive Systems, later renamed Cognitive Media Networks Inc. On August 10, 2015, Vizio acquired Cognitive Media Networks and renamed it Inscape. In July 2016 Vizio announced Inscape will spin off and operate as a separate, privately owned company.

== History ==
Inscape was founded in 2009 by Zeev Neumeier as TV Interactive Systems with Co-Founder and CTO Brian Reed. In 2012, the company raised $2.5 million in funding from Rogers Venture Partners, rebranded as Cognitive Networks, and hired Michael Collette as its CEO. On August 28, 2013, LG announced its LivePlus interactive service powered by Cognitive Network ACR. LG subsequently partnered with Showtime Network to launch in-program interactivity using Cognitive Network ACR.

On August 10, 2015, Vizio acquired Cognitive Networks and renamed it Inscape In July 2016 Vizio announced Inscape will spin off and operate as a separate, privately owned company with past Vizio CEO William Wang as new CEO.

On November 9, 2015, privacy advocate Julia Angwin exposed the Inscape technology in an investigative piece for Pro Publica to track consumer viewing habits within Vizio televisions and sharing it with advertisers.

Technology journals like Ars Technica investigated the matter and found that not only was Vizio observing its customers viewing behavior, it was quite easy for its software to be hacked and observed by third parties. Shortly after these reports, both Vizio and its subsidiary Inscape Data Services were named in numerous class action lawsuits for violation of the Video Privacy Protection Act.

== Audience panel ==
In 2020, Inscape created an audience panel called the National Representative Panel (NRP). Using ACR, the NRP was built from 15 million smart TVs in the US and claims the data to be representative of TV viewing for all US households, demographics, and geographies across 210 local markets. As of December 2022, the Vizio has access to about 21 million smart TVs, where about 10 million were opted-in and "calibrated" to TV viewing households. This data was created in partnership with Dativa, a company providing custom TV measurement strategy and solutions to brands, agencies and media companies.

To create a representative panel, the NRP requires an identity provider to match smart TVs to households, and then a household ID can be created by weighting smart devices that represent the United States census. The TVs are matched and balanced based on age, gender, income, location, cable subscription, antenna usage, and ethnicity. These TV IDs are sorted into audience population demographics based on the US census, so advertisers can "weight" their buys to optimize targeting and frequency across different demographics. As of December 2022, NRP only supports linear campaign programming and measurement due to contractual agreements with streaming content providers.
