= Onkyo HT-S9100THX =

- Manufacturer: Onkyo
- Product family: HT
- Type: Home theater in a box
- Released: 2008
- Weight: 97.9 lb (44.4 kg)

The Onkyo HT-S9100THX is Onkyo's home theater in a box (HTIB) released in 2008.

== Features ==
HT-S9100THX is a 7.1 system that includes full-size speakers, a 290-watt subwoofer, and an AV receiver (which features four HDMI ports and onboard decoding for Dolby TrueHD and DTS-HD Master Audio). The receiver includes THX's new Loudness Plus feature. It is supposed to improve audio intensity at lower volume levels.

== Reception ==
CNET noted the audio quality as outstanding but the upconverting video quality as mediocre. Sound & Vision wrote: "Although this product won’t win any awards for fancy aesthetics, you can close your eyes and imagine that you’re listening to something more powerful and better balanced than the price tag indicates." What Hi-Fi? summarized: "This system offers a heck of a lot for the money, but the overall sound delivery is too much of a compromise". Audioholics wrote: "If you have a lot of sources, and audio quality is your driving factor (isn't it always?) this may be the perfect system for you."
