= AcoustID =

Open source audio identification

- Developer: Lukáš Lalinský
- Type: audio identification service
- Pricing model: free for non-commercial use
- Website: acoustid.org

AcoustID is a webservice for the identification of music recordings based on the Chromaprint acoustic fingerprint algorithm. It can identify entire songs but not short snippets.

By 2017, the free service had 34 million "fingerprints" in-store and every day acquired between 15 and 20 thousand new entries and answered around five million search queries. AcoustID is integrated into the audio file metadata editors Picard, Jaikoz and Puddletag, for example.

== History & Chromaprint ==
In October 2009 MusicIP was acquired by AmpliFIND. Some time after the acquisition, the MusicDNS service began having intermittent problems. Since the future of the free identification service was uncertain, a replacement for it was sought. The Chromaprint acoustic fingerprinting algorithm, the basis for AcoustID identification service, was started in February 2010 by a long-time MusicBrainz contributor Lukáš Lalinský. The oldest entry in the database is from October 8th, 2010.

While AcoustID and Chromaprint are not officially MusicBrainz projects, they are closely tied with each other and both open source. Chromaprint works by analyzing the first two minutes of a track, detecting the strength in each of 12 pitch classes, storing these 8 times per second. Additional post-processing is then applied to compress this fingerprint while retaining patterns. The AcoustID search server then searches from the database of fingerprints by similarity and returns the AcoustID identifier along with MusicBrainz recording identifiers if known.

Since 2013 Chromaprint is the only fingerprint supported by MusicBrainz.

=== Fingerprint ID ===
The fingerprint IDs are 8-digit numbers from 10000000 to 99999999. E.g.

- https://acoustid.org/fingerprint/10374377 - one of the lowest numbers

== AcoustID "track" ==
Groups of Chromaprints are given a UUID and can be reached via https://acoustid.org/track/<uuid>, e.g. https://acoustid.org/track/a64cc174-c77c-47ee-ac1b-78015270dfe6.

The underlying chromaprints can be reached via fingerprint IDs, e.g.

ID                                             Length  Sources
https://acoustid.org/fingerprint/11799567	3:35	255
https://acoustid.org/fingerprint/41547743	3:36	152
https://acoustid.org/fingerprint/21463426	3:38	81

The linked MusicBrainz "recordings" can contain music of different performers, e.g.

- This Goodbye Is Not Forever (original radio edit) // Touché // 3:38
- This Is Not Goodbye // Melissa Etheridge // 3:35 // 1
