= Description language =

Description language may refer to:

- Interface description language aka interface definition language (IDL)
  - Regular Language description for XML (RELAX)
  - Web Services Description Language (WSDL)
  - Page description language (PDL)
- Binary Format Description language - extension of XSIL
- Hardware description language - for circuits
  - VHDL, Verilog - for Field-programmable gate arrays, and logic circuits
- Job Submission Description Language
- Architecture description language
- Specification and Description Language - a specification language
- Character Description Language - for CJK fonts

== See also ==
- DDL (disambiguation)
- Specification and Design Language
