= Interactions Corporation =

Customer-service software company

Interactions LLC
- Company type: Subsidiary
- Industry: Customer service software
- Founded: 2004
- Headquarters: United States
- Key people: Mike Iacobucci (CEO)
- Parent: SoundHound AI
- Website: www.interactions.com

Interactions LLC (also known as Interactions Corporation) is an American software company that develops voice and text-based virtual assistant applications for customer-service contact centers. Since September 2025, it has been a subsidiary of SoundHound AI.

== History ==
Interactions was founded in 2004.

In July 2011, the company announced a $12 million venture-capital funding round led by Sigma Partners.

In November 2014, AT&T sold its "Watson" speech recognition platform and related patents to Interactions in exchange for equity.

In May 2017, Interactions acquired the social media customer-engagement company Digital Roots; financial terms were not disclosed.

On September 3, 2025, SoundHound AI completed its acquisition of Interactions Corporation, with the acquired company becoming a wholly owned subsidiary.

== Products and services ==
Interactions' products have been described as automated voice portals and intelligent virtual assistants used for customer-service tasks. In 2011, Humana expanded the use of an Interactions voice portal for Medicare Part D enrollment.

== See also ==
- Virtual assistant (artificial intelligence)
- Interactive voice response
