= Adaptive Public License =

Open-source license

- Author: University of Victoria
- SPDX identifier: APL-1.0
- Debian FSG compatible: ?
- FSF approved: ?
- OSI approved: Yes
- GPL compatible: ?
- Copyleft: Yes
- Linking from code with a different license: ?
- Website: opensource.org/licenses/APL-1.0

The Adaptive Public License (APL) is an open-source license from the University of Victoria. It is a weak copyleft, adaptable template license that has been approved by the Open Source Initiative.

The Initial Contributor for a project sets up the license conditions for that project by choosing their specific options from the license template. Choices include:

- whether or not to grant patent rights
- governing jurisdiction
- limited attribution and branding clauses
- the scope of how widely the source can be distributed before being obliged to contribute code changes
- the extent to which changes need to be documented

== Selected programs licensed under the APL ==
- MusicDNS
- SwisTrack
