= Soundbase =

Type of loudspeaker enclosure designed for a television to stand on

A soundbase or sound base is a loudspeaker enclosure designed for a television to stand on. It creates a reasonable stereo effect from a single cabinet and was invented as a substitute for the relatively poor sound quality of loudspeakers built into flat-screen TVs.

Soundbases are similar in function to soundbars, but the latter is designed to be placed on a shelf separate from the TV or hung on the wall below it. The shape of soundbases typically enables them to have better bass than soundbars; soundbars often have a separate subwoofer to compensate for this.

By 2016, the market shifted from primarily selling soundbases to primarily selling soundbars.
