= Karaoke Callout =

Karaoke Callout is a karaoke dueling game developed by David A. Shamma and Bryan Pardo at the Interactive Audio Lab at Northwestern University. It is an example of a game with a purpose. Its purpose is to help train the Tunebot database by providing the system with more query to target matches.

The game was first developed and released in 2006 for the Nokia phone. The Interactive Audio Lab used this game to help train the Tunebot engine in preparation for research on improving the search engine. In the spring of 2009, Karaoke Callout expanded to a web-based game. It is also currently being developed on the iPhone to once again provide users with mobile play.

In gameplay, player 1 selects a song from a list of available songs that already exist in the database. Then they sing his version of the song. After player 1 is satisfied with his performance, the system provides him with a score. Then the player has the option of "calling out" a friend. This means that they challenges their friend to sing that song better than they did. The second player receives notification that the first player has challenged him to a duel and can respond by singing his version of the song. The system rates the second player's performance as well and send both player notifications of who won the duel.

== See also ==
Tunebot

Games with a purpose
