= Tunebot =

Music search engine

Tunebot is a query by humming music search engine developed by Arefin Huq, Mark Cartwright, and Bryan Pardo of the Interactive Audio Lab at Northwestern University. Users can search the database by humming or singing a melody into a microphone, playing the melody on a virtual keyboard, or by typing some of the lyrics. As of 2010, its database held around 3,000 songs, built up through user contributions and an associated iPhone game, Karaoke Callout, that helped crowdsource sung examples.

== Searching techniques ==
Tunebot is a query by humming system. It compares a sung query to a database of musical themes by using the intervals between each note. This allows a user to sing in a different key than the target recording and still produce a match. The intervals are also unquantized to allow for other tunings besides the standard A=440 Hz, since not many people in the world have perfect pitch.

In addition to note intervals, Tunebot compares a query with potential targets by using rhythmic ratios between notes. Since ratios between note lengths are used, the tempo of the performance does not affect the rhythmic similarity measure.

Queries and targets are then matched by a weighted string alignment algorithm between the note intervals and rhythmic ratios.

== Database ==
The database consists of unaccompanied melodies sung by contributors (a cappella). Contributors log into the website and sing their examples to the system. Each of these recordings is associated with a corresponding song on Amazon. A sung query is compared to these examples. A cappella sung examples are used as search keys because it is much easier to compare one unaccompanied vocal (the sung query) to another (an example search key) than it is to compare an unaccompanied vocal to a full band recording, which may contain guitar, drums, other singers, sound effects, etc.

== Distinguishing features ==
Tunebot learns from user input, and it improve its results as each user submits more queries. Since no human can sing perfectly in tune every time they sing, the search engine must take that into account. By choosing a song from a list of ranked results, users tell Tunebot which song was correct. Tunebot then pairs that song with the user's query, analyzes the differences, and runs a genetic algorithm. This process tweaks the parameters that control how the system compares the user's query to the targets. For instance, if a user has no sense of rhythm, that factor of the comparison is lowered for future queries.
