= Amelia (company) =

American technology company

Coordinates: 40°42′10″N 74°00′50″W

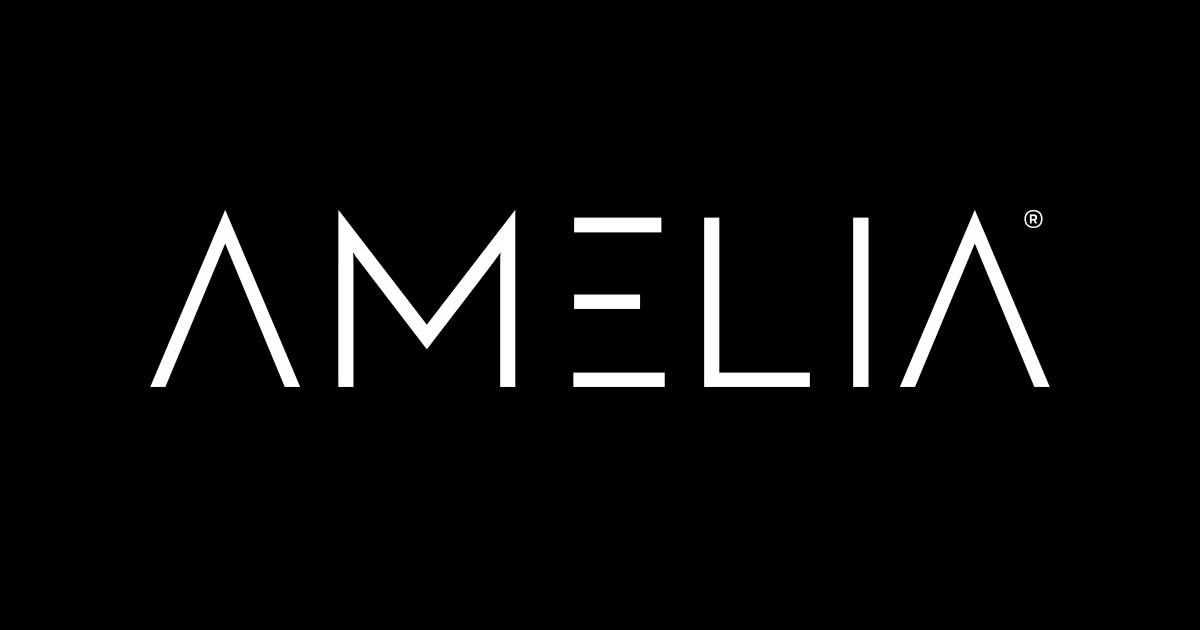
- Formerly: IPsoft, inc.
- Company type: Private
- Industry: Technology; Autonomic computing; Artificial Intelligence
- Founded: 1998; 28 years ago
- Founders: Chetan Dube
- Headquarters: New York, U.S.
- Area served: Worldwide
- Key people: Chetan Dube (Founder and CEO); Lanham Napier (President and Chairman)
- Products: Amelia Conversational AI; Amelia AIOps
- Owner: SoundHound AI
- Website: amelia.ai

Amelia, formerly known as IPsoft, is an American technology company. It primarily focuses on artificial intelligence and cognitive and autonomic products for business. Its main products are Amelia, a Conversational AI platform, and Amelia AIOps, an IT operations management platform.

Headquartered in New York City, it has a presence in the Americas, Europe, APAC and the UK.

== History ==
The company was founded as IPsoft, Inc., in New York City in 1998 by Chetan Dube, a former professor at New York University at the Courant Institute of Mathematical Sciences. The company rebranded to Amelia in October 2020.

In August 2024, SoundHound AI acquired Amelia in a transaction valued at approximately US $80 million.

== Products ==
=== Amelia Conversational AI ===
Amelia is an AI-based digital assistant. The platform uses generative AI and cognitive AI to allow businesses to build, deploy and optimize virtual agents that can handle a wide range of business functions. Amelia is most often deployed to provide user-facing support, as well as assist contact center agents during live conversations.

Amelia was first released in 2014. As of 2024, Amelia has been deployed to improve customer care, employee services and operational efficiency for hundreds of global enterprises across various industries, including Securities Services at BNP Paribas, Resorts World Las Vegas, Aeromexico, Visionworks and ASICS.

=== Amelia AIOps ===
Released in 2017, Amelia AIOps (formerly 1Desk) is an enterprise-scale autonomic framework that integrates IT operations and shared services. The platform integrates with Amelia to access the autonomic framework via a conversational interface.

Amelia AIOps features an integration framework to connect with any existing platform with an open API. Its proprietary Machine Learning functionality (internally dubbed "IPconnect") recommends new automations based on observed behaviors of human workers.
