= Device Description Language =

Device Description Language (DDL) is the formal language describing the service and configuration of field devices for process and factory automation.

== Background ==
Current field devices for process and factory automation have a number of configuration options, to customize them to their individual use case. For these means they are equipped with a digital communication interface (HART, PROFIBUS, Fieldbus Foundation). Different software tools provide the means to control and configure the devices. In the 1990s, the DDL was developed to remove the requirement to write a new software tool for each new device type. Software can, through the interpretation of a device description (DD), configure and control many different devices. The creation of a description with the DDL is less effort than writing an entire software tool.

The HART Communication Foundation, PROFIBUS and Fieldbus Foundation have merged their individual dialects of the DDL. The result became the Electronic Device Description Language (EDDL), an IEC standard (IEC 61804).

The harmonization and enhancement of the EDDL is being undertaken in the EDDL Cooperation Team (ECT). The ECT consists of the leadership of the Fieldbus Foundation, Profibus Nutzerorganisation (PNO), Hart Communication Foundation, OPC Foundation and the FDT Group.

== Structure of the DDL ==
The DDL describes:

- Data (e.g. Parameters)
- Communication (e.g. Addressing Information)
- User Interfaces
- Operations (e.g. Calibration)

== Software ==
A device description (DD) can be created with a plain text editor. But like any other programing or description language, the authoring is error prone and as such special development tools may be used, to create valid and norm conforming EDDs.

The following tools assists the creation of EDDs:

- isEDD Workbench and EDD Checker (ifak e.V. Magdeburg) - Norm conformity to the IEC 61804 parts 3, 4 and 5

The following control and configuration tools interpret the DDL:

- SIMATIC PDM - "The Process Device Manager" (Siemens)
- AMS Intelligent Device Manager(Emerson Process Management)
- SDC 625 (HART)
- FDM (Honeywell)
- isEDDview DTM (ifak system GmbH)
- iDTM für FieldCare (Endress+Hauser)
- DevCom2000 (ProComSol, Ltd)
- DevComDroid (ProComSol, Ltd)
- DevCom.iOS (ProComSol, Ltd)
