= AmpliFIND =

Acoustic fingerprinting service

- Developer: MusicIP
- Type: audio identification service
- Website: AmpliFIND Music Services

AmpliFIND is an acoustic fingerprinting service and a software development kit developed by the US company MusicIP.

MusicIP first marketed their fingerprinting algorithm and service as MusicDNS. In 2006, MusicIP reported that the MusicDNS database had more than 22 million fingerprints of digital audio recordings. One of their customers was MetaBrainz Foundation, a non-profit company that used MusicDNS in their MusicBrainz and MusicBrainz Picard software products.

Even so, MusicIP dissolved in 2008. The company's CEO, Andrew Stess, bought the rights to MusicDNS, renamed the software to AmpliFIND, and started a new company called AmpliFIND Music Services. In 2011, Stess sold AmpliFIND to Sony, who incorporated it into the digital music service offerings of their Gracenote division. Tribune Media subsequently purchased Gracenote, including the MusicDNS software.

== How MusicDNS identifies a recording ==
To use the MusicDNS service, software developers write a computer program that incorporates an open-source software library called LibOFA. This library implements the Open Fingerprint Architecture, a specification developed during 2000–2005 by MusicIP's previous incarnation, Predixis Corporation.

Through LibOFA, a program can fingerprint a recording, and submit the fingerprint to MusicDNS via the Internet. MusicDNS attempts to match the submission to fingerprints in its database. If the MusicDNS service finds an approximate match, it returns a code called a PUID (Portable Unique Identifier). This code does not contain any acoustic information; rather, it enables a computer program to retrieve identifying information (such as the song title and recording artist) from the MusicDNS database. The PUID code is a short, alphanumeric string based on the universally unique identifier standard.

The source code for LibOFA is distributed under a dual license: the GNU General Public License and the Adaptive Public License. The MusicDNS software that makes the fingerprints is proprietary.

== See also ==
- Automatic content recognition
