= MusicBrainz =

Online music metadata database

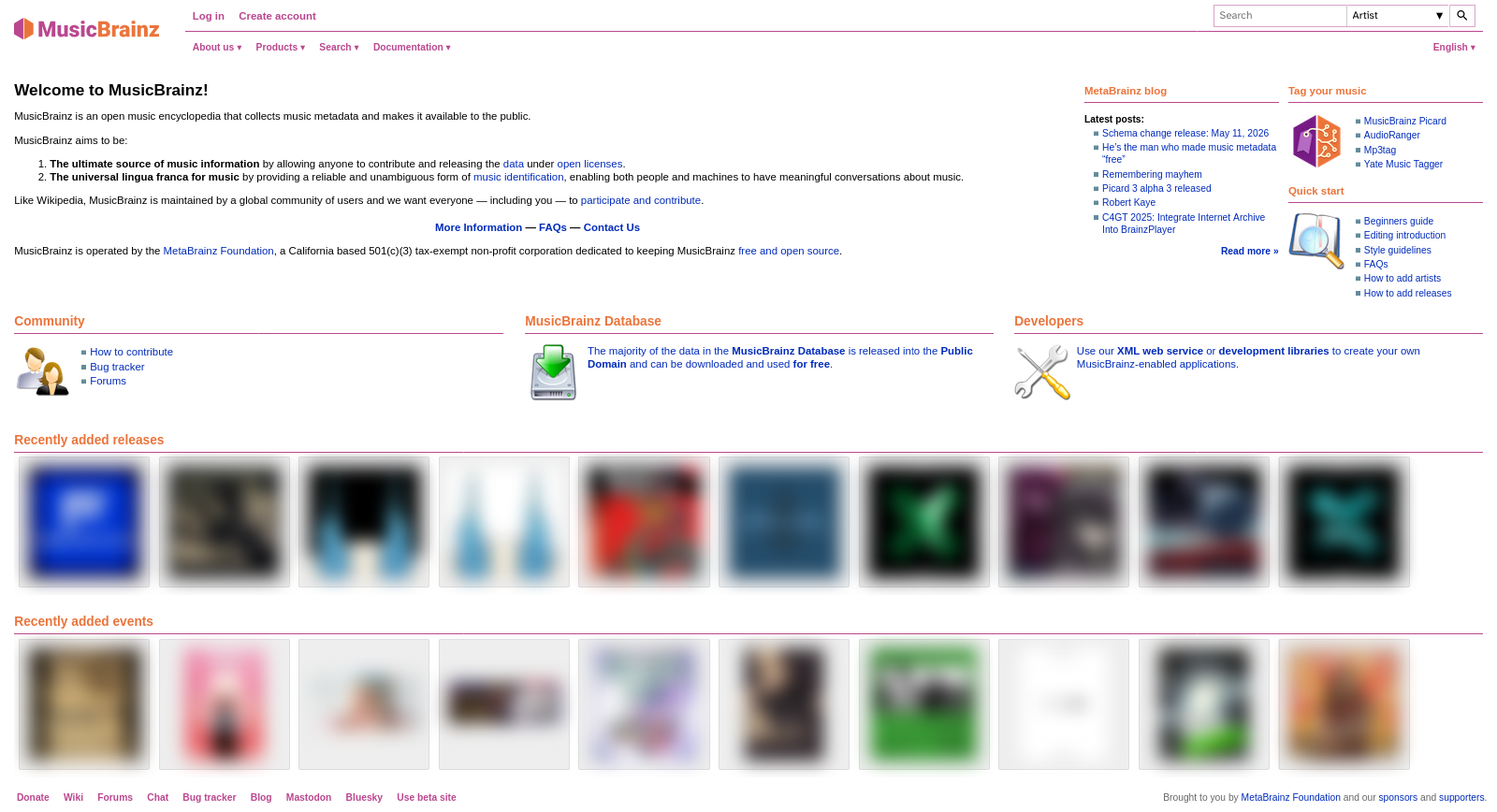
- Homepage (artwork censored for copyright reasons)
- Company type: Community-driven data library
- Website type: Online music encyclopedia
- Available in: English
- Headquarters: San Luis Obispo, California, U.S.
- Owner: MetaBrainz Foundation
- Founder: Robert Kaye
- Industry: Audio metadata
- Website: musicbrainz.org
- IPv6 support: Yes
- Commercial: No (non-profit)
- Registration: Optional (required for editing data)
- Users: 1,420,286+
- Launched: July 17, 2000; 26 years ago
- Current status: Online
- Content license: CC Zero 1.0 Universal (open data); CC BY-NC-SA 3.0 Unported (contributor-generated data); Commercial licensing available
- Written in: Perl with PostgreSQL database

MusicBrainz is a project by the MetaBrainz Foundation that aims to create a collaborative music database similar to the freedb project. MusicBrainz was founded in response to the restrictions placed on the Compact Disc Database (CDDB), a database used by software applications to look up audio CD information on the Internet. MusicBrainz has expanded its goals beyond serving as a CD metadata repository, evolving into a structured online database for music information, including details about artists, performers, and songwriters.

MusicBrainz captures information about artists, their recorded works, and the relationships between them. Recorded works entries capture the album title, track titles, and the length of each track at a minimum. These entries are maintained by volunteer editors who follow community written style guidelines. Recorded works can also store information about release date and country, the CD ID, cover art, acoustic fingerprint, free-form annotation text and other metadata. As of November 2026, MusicBrainz contains information on over 3 million artists, 5.9 million releases, and 40.8 million recordings. End-users can use software that communicates with MusicBrainz to add metadata tags to their digital media files, such as AAC, ALAC, FLAC, Monkey's Audio. MP3, Ogg Vorbis or WavPack.

== Image archives ==
=== Cover Art Archive ===
Logo of Cover Art Archive

MusicBrainz allows contributors to upload cover art images of releases to the database; these images are hosted by Cover Art Archive (CAA), a joint project between Internet Archive and MusicBrainz started in 2012. Internet Archive provides the bandwidth, storage, and legal protection for hosting the images, while MusicBrainz stores metadata and provides public access through the Web and via an API for third parties to use. As with other contributions, the MusicBrainz community is in charge of maintaining and reviewing the data. Until May 16, 2022, cover art was also provided for items on sale at Amazon and some other online resources, but CAA is now preferred, because it gives the community more control and flexibility for managing the images. As of November 2026, over 7.6 million images are stored in the archive.

=== Event Art Archive ===
In June 2024, MusicBrainz launched the Event Art Archive, another joint venture with the Internet Archive. The project is labeled as "the internet's greatest repository for event art", and as of November 2026, contains over 24,900 images.

== Fingerprinting ==
In addition to collecting metadata about music, MusicBrainz also allows users to match recordings by their acoustic fingerprint. A separate application, such as MusicBrainz Picard, is used to do this.

=== Proprietary services ===
In 2000, MusicBrainz started using Relatable's patented TRM (a recursive acronym for TRM Recognizes Music) for acoustic fingerprint matching. The popularity of this feature drew in a large user base to the platform, enabling the database to expand rapidly. By 2005, TRM was experiencing difficulties in handling the sheer volume of data, as the number of tracks stored in the database had surpassed one million. This issue was resolved in May 2006, when MusicBrainz partnered with MusicIP (now AmpliFIND), replacing TRM with MusicDNS. TRMs were phased out and replaced by MusicDNS in November 2008.

In October 2009, MusicIP was acquired by AmpliFIND.

=== AcoustID and Chromaprint ===
Since the future of the free identification service was uncertain, a replacement for it was sought. The Chromaprint acoustic fingerprinting algorithm, which serves as the basis for the AcoustID identification service, was started in February 2010 by long-time MusicBrainz contributor, Lukáš Lalinský. While AcoustID and Chromaprint are not officially MusicBrainz projects, they are closely tied with each other and are both open source. Chromaprint works by analyzing the first two minutes of a track, detecting the strength for each of 12 pitch classes, storing these eight times per second. Additional post-processing is then applied to compress the fingerprint while retaining patterns. The AcoustID search server then searches from the database of fingerprints by similarity and returns the AcoustID identifier along with MusicBrainz recording identifiers, if known.

== Licensing ==
Since 2003, MusicBrainz's core data (artists, recordings, releases, etc.) is dedicated to the worldwide public domain, according to the terms of the Creative Commons Zero 1.0 Universal legal tool. Additional content, including moderation data (essentially all original content contributed by users and its elaborations) and the live data feed, are published under the copyleft terms of the Creative Commons Attribution-NonCommercial-ShareAlike 3.0 Unported License as of December 12, 2012. The relational database management system is PostgreSQL. The server software is covered by the GNU General Public License v2.0, while the MusicBrainz client software library, libmusicbrainz, is licensed under the GNU Lesser General Public License, version 2.1, which allows use of the code by proprietary software products.

In December 2004, the MusicBrainz project was turned over to the MetaBrainz Foundation – a non-profit group based in San Luis Obispo, California – by its creator Robert Kaye. On January 20, 2006, the first commercial venture to use MusicBrainz data was the Barcelona, Spain-based Linkara in their "Linkara Música" service.

On June 28, 2007, the BBC announced that it had licensed MusicBrainz's live data feed to augment their music web pages. BBC online music editors would also join the MusicBrainz community to contribute their knowledge to the database.

On July 28, 2008, the beta of the new BBC Music site was launched, which publishes a page for each MusicBrainz artist.

== MusicBrainz Picard ==
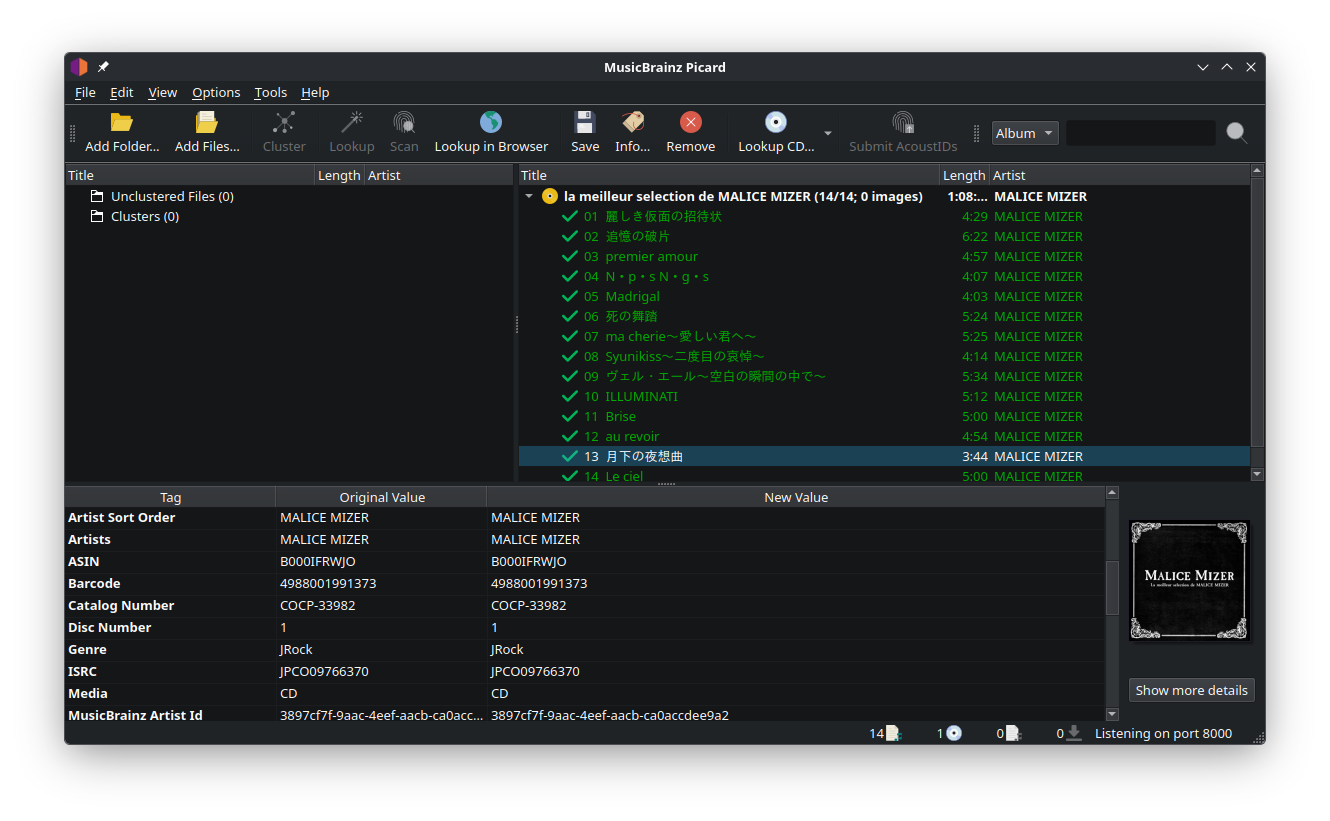
Screenshot of MusicBrainz Picard

MusicBrainz Picard is a free and open-source software application for identifying, tagging and organizing digital audio recordings.

Picard identifies audio files and compact discs by comparing either their metadata or their acoustic fingerprints with records in the database. Audio file metadata (or "tags") are a means of storing information about a recording in the file. When Picard identifies an audio file, it can add new information to it, such as the recording artist, the album title, the record label, and the date of release.

=== Example of MusicBrainz Picard tags ===
Here is an example of APEv2 tags as used by a WavPack format file taken from Piano Opera FINAL FANTASY VII / VIII / IX by Nobuo Uematsu after being tagged with MusicBrainz Picard:

Album:             Piano Opera FINAL FANTASY VII / VIII / IX 
Album Artist:      植松伸夫 
Albumartistsort:   Uematsu, Nobuo 
Artist:            植松伸夫 
Artists:           植松伸夫 
Artistsort:        Uematsu, Nobuo 
Barcode:           4988601463935 
CatalogNumber:     SQEX-10432 
Composer:          植松伸夫 
Disc:              1/1 
Genre:             Classical 
Label:             SQUARE ENIX 
Media:             CD 
Musicbrainz_Albumartistid: 92bb085a-2924-4479-b627-181a1835d2f5\836efab3-fb2c-45fc-afac-10d0598cfbba 
Musicbrainz_Albumid: 22d24613-8c3b-461d-ae3d-fd7b9786581c 
MUSICBRAINZ_ALBUMSTATUS: official 
MUSICBRAINZ_ALBUMTYPE: album 
Musicbrainz_Artistid: 92bb085a-2924-4479-b627-181a1835d2f5 
Musicbrainz_Releasegroupid: 653cc2ee-301c-46de-86df-deb7623a37e8 
musicbrainz_releasetrackid: 3031e37b-f395-4903-9a13-1c031d636e59 
musicbrainz_trackid: ed485087-e253-43d2-a503-105e857ed046 
Originaldate:      2014-04-23 
Originalyear:      2014 
Performer:         中山 博之 
Releasecountry:    JP 
REPLAYGAIN_ALBUM_GAIN: -5.56 dB 
REPLAYGAIN_ALBUM_PEAK: 1.000000 
REPLAYGAIN_TRACK_GAIN: -6.42 dB 
REPLAYGAIN_TRACK_PEAK: 1.000000 
Script:            Jpan 
Title:             オープニング〜爆破ミッション [FINAL FANTASY VII] 
Tool Name:         fre:ac 
Tool Version:      v1.1.7 
Track:             11/12 
Year:              2014-04-23 
Cover Art (Front): 37684-byte binary item (jpg)

== ListenBrainz ==
ListenBrainz logo

ListenBrainz is a free and open source project that aims to crowdsource listening data related to digital music and release it under an open license. It is a MetaBrainz Foundation project tied to MusicBrainz. It aims to re-implement Last.fm features that were lost following that platform's acquisition by CBS.

ListenBrainz takes submissions in the form of "listens" representing the playback of songs or videos from various media players and services such as Clementine/Strawberry, Music Player Daemon and Spotify or other scrobbling mechanisms such as browser extensions. ListenBrainz can also import Last.fm and Libre.fm scrobbles in order to build listening history. As listens are released under an open license, ListenBrainz is useful for music research in industry and development research.

== See also ==
- List of online music databases
