= Video Monitoring Services of America =

Corporation that collects and distributes information about TV news broadcasting

Video Monitoring Services of America collects and distributes information about TV news broadcasting and its viewership.

== History ==
Robert J. Cohen founded VMS.

The New York Times described them as "a company that tracks news programs in major cities." Their coverage includes news about the industry. News sources use their transcripts and statistics.

They bought a Phoenix-based clipping service in 1998.

Their "VMS DOES!" ads in Advertising Age used time-pressured "Do You Know" captions (Do You Know How To Get A Reel Of All Commercials Featuring 7 Guys In Flowered Hats ... By Noon Tomorrow?, Do You Know Your Competitor Broke Their New Coffee TV Campaign In Seattle Last Night?) appearing with unusual images.

== Controversy ==
Their operation involves recording 24/7 and then selectively reviewing broadcast. It was proven in court that they sold a 30-minute CNN segment. CNN then attempted to get an order blocking all future recordings. Video Monitoring countered that this was over-reaching, especially since future broadcast do not exist; by law, something that does not exist cannot be copyrighted. From prior cases it was clarified that "The primary objective of copyright is not to reward the labor or authors, but '[t]o promote the Progress of Science and useful Arts.'"
