= William Wang =

Taiwanese-American billionaire entrepreneur (born 1963)

- 王蔚
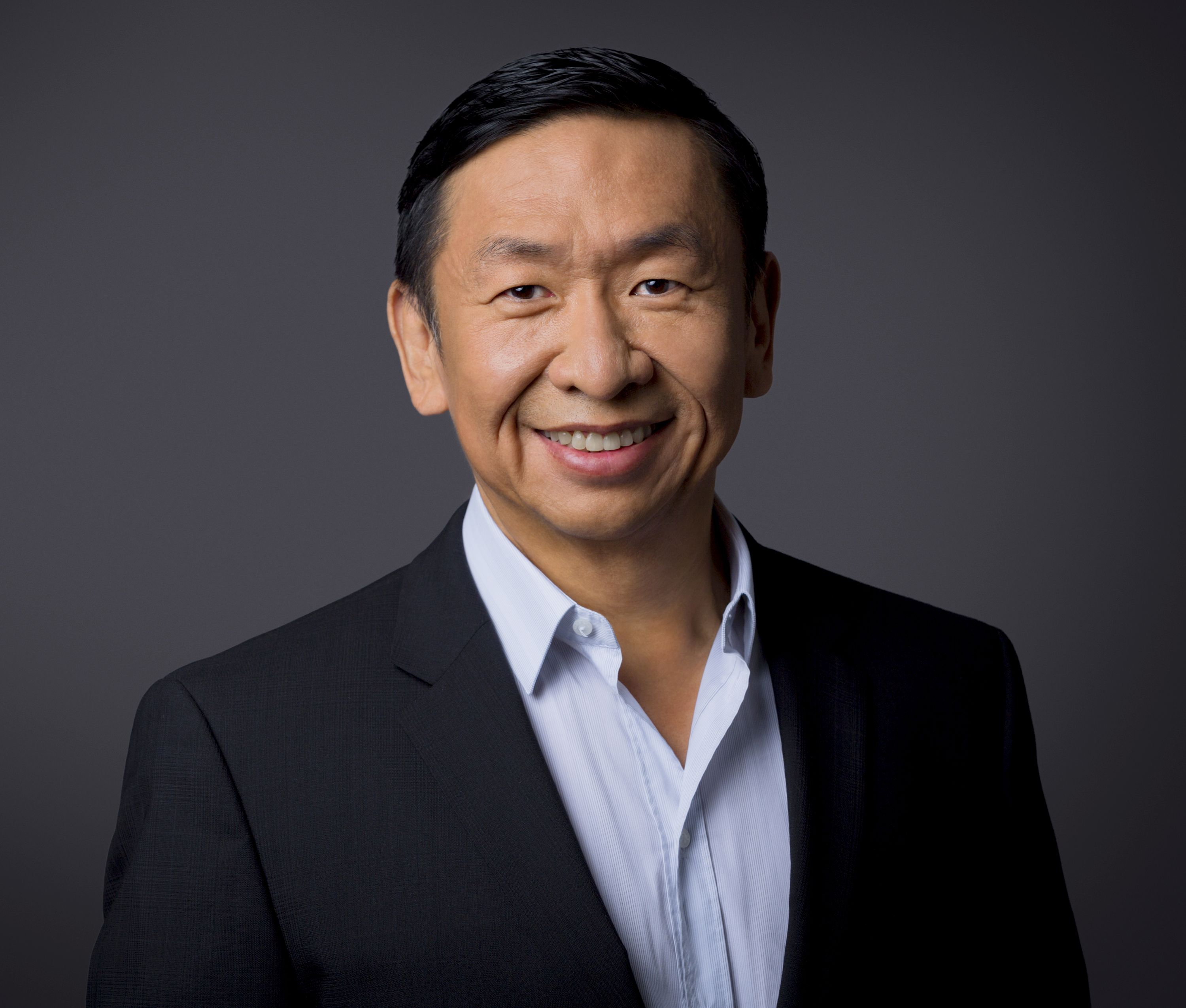
- Wang in 2014
- Born: 18 December 1963 (age 62); Taipei, Taiwan
- Education: University of Southern California (BS)
- Known for: Founding Vizio
- Title: Founder & CEO of Vizio

William Wang (Chinese: 王蔚; pinyin: Wáng Wèi; born 18 December 1963) is a Taiwanese-American entrepreneur. He is the founder and CEO of Vizio.

== Early life and education ==
Wang was born in Taipei, Taiwan, moved to Hawaii, United States, at the age of 12, and then to California at the age of 14. He attended the University of Southern California and graduated with a degree in electrical engineering in 1986.

== VIZIO ==
In 2000, Wang survived the crash of Singapore Airlines Flight 006, suffering only carbon monoxide poisoning. The tragedy provided an opportunity for Wang to reorganize his thoughts and his life. Within two years, Wang had closed down all of his businesses before entering the television market.

In 2001, Gateway, Inc. asked Wang to help put together a TV plan. Ted Waitt, Gateway's then chairman, had been one of Wang's customers at MAG, his former company and had become a mentor to Wang. Wang's team helped Gateway put together its 42-inch plasma TV system, priced at $2999. Comparable systems at the time sold for upwards of $6000. Not long after that, Wang entered into television manufacture with his own firm.

He started V Inc. in 2002 with Laynie Newsome, Ken Lowe and $600,000. His idea was to combine low prices with high quality and exceptional customer support, and to make this approach profitable through extremely lean operations. When V Inc. was found to be hard to pronounce, he renamed the company VIZIO Inc. – the name used for their plasma TV. The company is now one of the largest sellers of LCD HDTVs in North America with a multibillion-dollar revenue.
