= Soundbar =

Type of loudspeaker

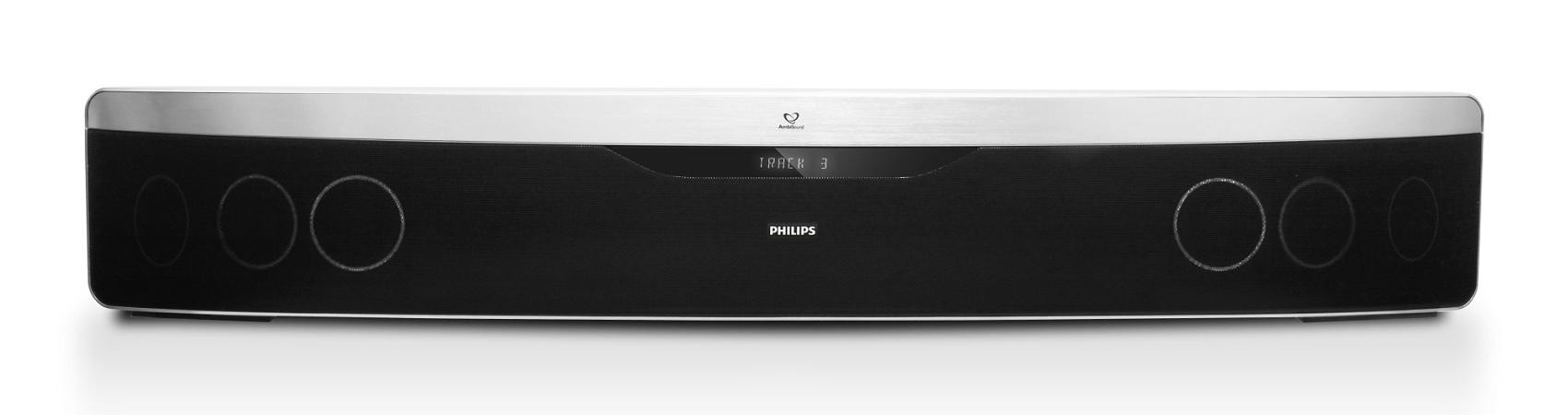
A Philips soundbar

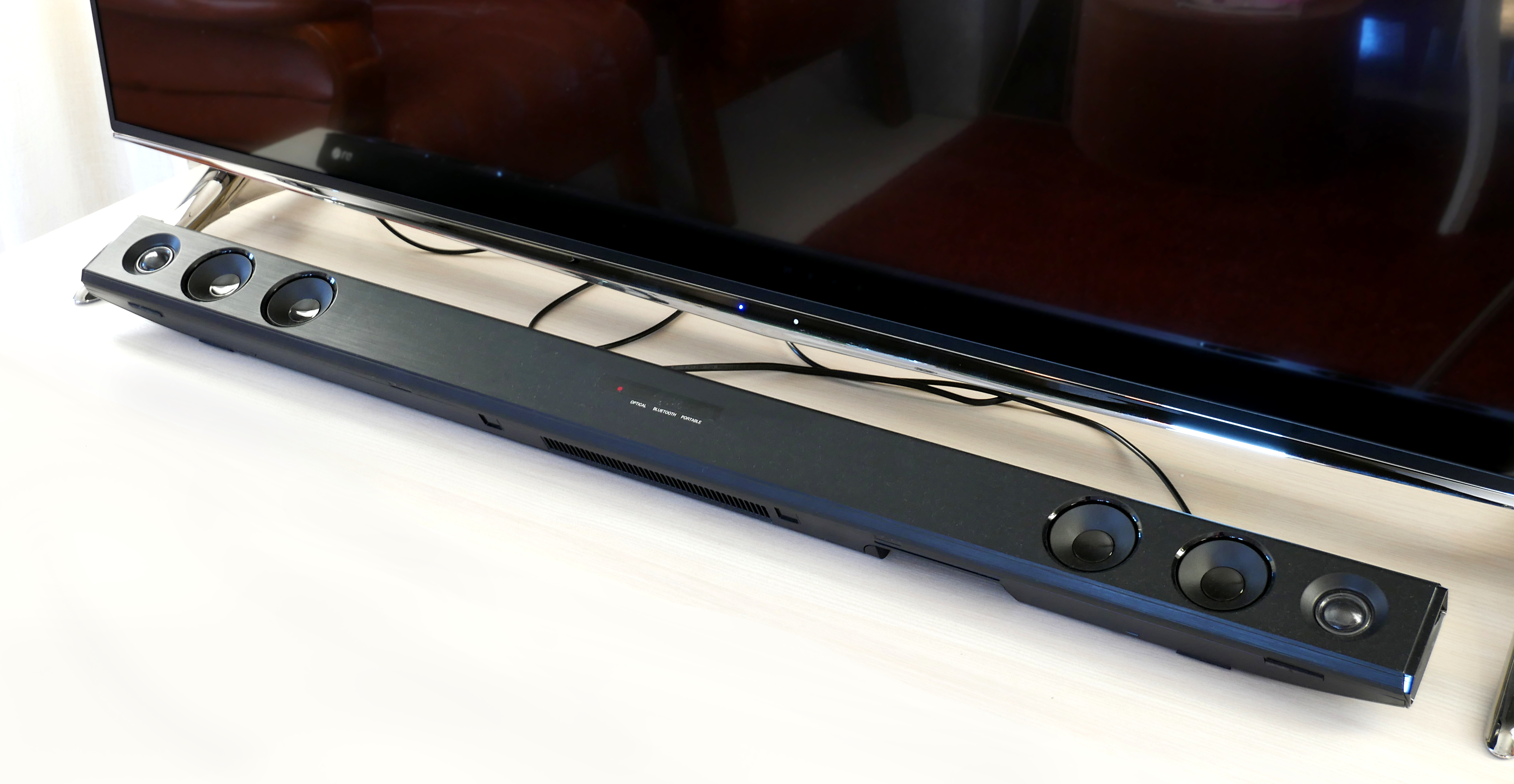
A typical soundbar setup, placed centered in front of a TV below the screen

A soundbar, sound bar or media bar is a type of loudspeaker that projects audio from a wide enclosure. It is much wider than it is tall, partly for acoustic reasons, and partly so it can be mounted above or below a display device (e.g. above a computer monitor or under a home theater or television screen). In a soundbar, multiple speakers are placed in a single cabinet, which helps to create stereo sound and surround sound effect. A separate subwoofer is typically included with, or may be used to supplement, a soundbar.

== History ==
One of the earliest attempts at a soundbar was the TeleSound Model 1300, marketed by TeleSound, Inc., in 1980. The TeleSound comprises a single wide enclosure with two 5-watt loudspeakers spaced 12 inches apart. Connecting a television set's mono output to the TeleSound via a 3.5 mm audio jack allows viewers to watch television in simulated stereo. Alternatively, separate left and right audio jacks allow for true stereo playback from LaserDisc players or special video tape players.

Later early passive versions simply integrated left, centre and right speakers into one enclosure, sometimes called an "LCR soundbar".

Altec Lansing introduced a multichannel soundbar in 1998 called the "Voice of the Digital Theatre" or the ADA106. It was a powered speaker system that offered stereo, Dolby Pro-Logic and AC3 surround sound from the soundbar and a separate subwoofer. The soundbar contained four 3-inch full range drivers and two 1-inch tweeters while the subwoofer housed one 8-inch dual voice coil driver. It used Altec Lansing's side-firing technology and algorithms to provide surround sound from the sides, rear and front. This configuration eliminated the wiring of separate speakers and the space they would require.

In 2004, Yamaha released YSP-1 soundbar, it can be considered as world's first 5.1 surround soundbar.

Now interface of soundbar evolved to audio jack, S/PDIF and HDMI.

== Advantages and disadvantages ==
Soundbars are relatively small and can be easily positioned under a display, are easy to set up, and are usually less expensive than other stereo sound systems. However, because of their smaller size and lack of flexibility in positioning, soundbars do not fill a room with sound as well as separate-speaker stereo systems do.

Soundbars have also been criticized for their lack of upgradability. While a sound system using a receiver can be paired with most speakers and subwoofers, soundbars are usually only compatible with their manufacturer's bespoke options, if upgradable at all. Some higher end soundbars have the ability to perform firmware or similar updates to its soundbar to upgrade the sound or similar things and add new functions.

== Soundbar hybrid ==
To take advantages both from soundbar and stereo set system, some manufacturers produce soundbar hybrids in which the soundbar represents left, center, and right speakers; the subwoofer and rear-left and rear-right speakers are connected wirelessly to the soundbar. The setup offers all channels needed to produce 5.1 surround.

With the increasing availability of Dolby Atmos content since 2021, it has become increasingly important for soundbars to produce height effects. The conventional setup involves additional wireless up-firing speakers: the ceiling of the room is to bounce height effects off the ceiling, towards the listener. Audio specialized companies such as Nakamichi offer a different approach, in which proprietary upmixing algorithms (patial-amplification, phase improvements, height effect sound layer interlacing) allow a regular 7.1/7.2/9.2 system to provide height effects.A more recent development is Dolby Atmos FlexConnect, which detects the positions of wireless speakers and adjusts the audio to them rather than requiring fixed placement; LG's H7 soundbar, introduced in December 2025 as part of its Sound Suite system, was among the first soundbars to adopt it.

== Usage ==
Soundbars were primarily designed to generate strong sound with good bass response. Soundbar usage has increased steadily as the world has moved to flat-screen displays. Earlier television sets and display units were primarily CRT-based; hence the box was bigger, facilitating larger speakers with good response. But with flat-screen televisions the depth of the screen is reduced dramatically, leaving little room for speakers. As a result, the built-in speakers lack bass response. Soundbars help to bridge this gap.

== See also ==
- Soundbase
- Home theater in a box
