= MPEG-7 =

Video encoding standard

MPEG-7 is a multimedia content description standard. It was standardized in ISO/IEC 15938 (Multimedia content description interface). This description will be associated with the content itself, to allow fast and efficient searching for material that is of interest to the user. MPEG-7 is formally called Multimedia Content Description Interface. Thus, it is not a standard which deals with the actual encoding of moving pictures and audio, like MPEG-1, MPEG-2 and MPEG-4. It uses XML to store metadata, and can be attached to timecode in order to tag particular events, or synchronise lyrics to a song, for example.

It was designed to standardize:

- a set of Description Schemes ("DS") and Descriptors ("D")
- a language to specify these schemes, called the Description Definition Language ("DDL")
- a scheme for coding the description

The combination of MPEG-4 and MPEG-7 has been sometimes referred to as MPEG-47.

== Introduction ==
MPEG-7 is intended to complement the previous MPEG standards, by standardizing multimedia metadata -- information about the content, not the content itself. MPEG-7 can be used independently of the other MPEG standards - the description might even be attached to an analog movie. The representation that is defined within MPEG-4, i.e. the representation of audio-visual data in terms of objects, is however very well suited to what will be built on the MPEG-7 standard. This representation is basic to the process of categorization. In addition, MPEG-7 descriptions could be used to improve the functionality of previous MPEG standards. With these tools, we can build an MPEG-7 Description and deploy it. According to the requirements document,1 "a Description consists of a Description Scheme (structure) and the set of Descriptor Values (instantiations) that describe the Data." A Descriptor Value is "an instantiation of a Descriptor for a given data set (or subset thereof)." The Descriptor is the syntactic and semantic definition of the content. Extraction algorithms are inside the scope of the standard because their standardization is not required to allow interoperability.

== Parts ==
The MPEG-7 (ISO/IEC 15938) consists of different Parts. Each part covers a certain aspect of the whole specification.

MPEG-7 Parts
| Part | Number | First public release date (First edition) | Latest public release date (edition) | Latest amendment | Title | Description |
|---|---|---|---|---|---|---|
| Part 1 | ISO/IEC 15938-1 | 2002 | 2002 | 2006 | Systems | the architectural framework of MPEG-7, the carriage of MPEG-7 content - TeM (Textual format for MPEG-7) and the binary format for MPEG-7 descriptions (BiM) |
| Part 2 | ISO/IEC 15938-2 | 2002 | 2002 | | Description definition language | |
| Part 3 | ISO/IEC 15938-3 | 2002 | 2002 | 2010 | Visual | |
| Part 4 | ISO/IEC 15938-4 | 2002 | 2002 | 2006 | Audio | |
| Part 5 | ISO/IEC 15938-5 | 2003 | 2003 | 2015 | Multimedia description schemes | |
| Part 6 | ISO/IEC 15938-6 | 2003 | 2003 | 2011 | Reference software | |
| Part 7 | ISO/IEC 15938-7 | 2003 | 2003 | 2011 | Conformance testing | |
| Part 8 | ISO/IEC TR 15938-8 | 2002 | 2002 | 2011 | Extraction and use of MPEG-7 descriptions | |
| Part 9 | ISO/IEC 15938-9 | 2005 | 2005 | 2012 | Profiles and levels | |
| Part 10 | ISO/IEC 15938-10 | 2005 | 2005 | | Schema definition | |
| Part 11 | ISO/IEC TR 15938-11 | 2005 | 2005 | 2012 | MPEG-7 profile schemas | |
| Part 12 | ISO/IEC 15938-12 | 2008 | 2012 | | Query format | |
| Part 13 | ISO/IEC 15938-13 | 2015 | 2015 | | Compact descriptors for visual search | |

== Relation between description and content ==
Independence between description and content

An MPEG-7 architecture requirement is that description must be separate from the audiovisual content.

On the other hand, there must be a relation between the content and description. Thus the description is multiplexed with the content itself.

On the right side you can see this relation between description and content.

== MPEG-7 tools ==
Relation between different tools and elaboration process of MPEG-7

MPEG-7 uses the following tools:

- Descriptor (D): It is a representation of a feature defined syntactically and semantically. It could be that a unique object was described by several descriptors.
- Description Schemes (DS): Specify the structure and semantics of the relations between its components, these components can be descriptors (D) or description schemes (DS).
- Description Definition Language (DDL): It is based on XML language used to define the structural relations between descriptors. It allows the creation and modification of description schemes and also the creation of new descriptors (D).
- System tools: These tools deal with binarization, synchronization, transport and storage of descriptors. It also deals with Intellectual Property protection.

On the right side you can see the relation between MPEG-7 tools.

== MPEG-7 applications ==
There are many applications and application domains which will benefit from the MPEG-7 standard. A few application examples are:

- Digital library: Image/video catalogue, musical dictionary.
- Multimedia directory services: e.g. yellow pages.
- Broadcast media selection: Radio channel, TV channel.
- Multimedia editing: Personalized electronic news service, media authoring.
- Security services: Traffic control, production chains...
- E-business: Searching process of products.
- Cultural services: Art-galleries, museums...
- Educational applications.
- Biomedical applications.
- Intelligent multimedia applications that leverage low-level multimedia semantics via formal representation and automated reasoning.

== See also ==
- Exif
- ID3
- Metadata standards
- MPEG-4 Part 11 – Scene description and application engine
- Multimedia information retrieval
- Query by humming

== Limitations ==
The MPEG-7 standard was originally written in XML Schema (XSD), which constitutes semi-structured data. For example, the running time of a movie annotated using MPEG-7 in XML is machine-readable data, so software agents will know that the number expressing the running time is a positive integer, but such data is not machine-interpretable (cannot be understood by agents), because it does not convey semantics (meaning), known as the "Semantic Gap." To address this issue, there were many attempts to map the MPEG-7 XML Schema to the Web Ontology Language (OWL), which is a structured data equivalent of the terms of the MPEG-7 standard (MPEG-7Ontos, COMM, SWIntO, etc.). However, these mappings did not really bridge the "Semantic Gap," because low-level video features alone are inadequate for representing video semantics. In other words, annotating an automatically extracted video feature, such as color distribution, does not provide the meaning of the actual visual content.

== Compare ==
- Material Exchange Format (MXF), a container format for professional digital video and audio media defined by SMPTE.
