= SoundHound AI =

American music and speech recognition company

SoundHound AI, Inc.
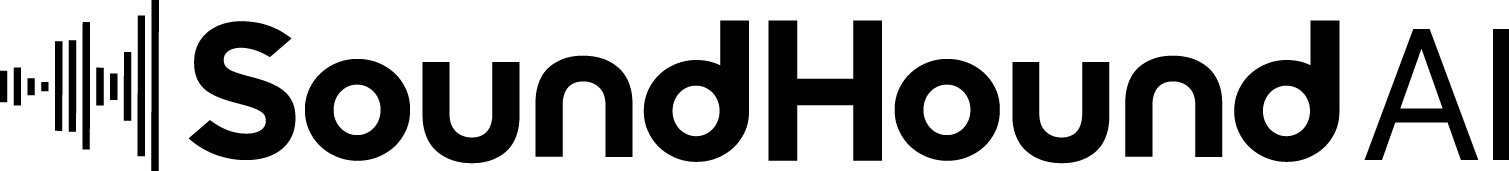

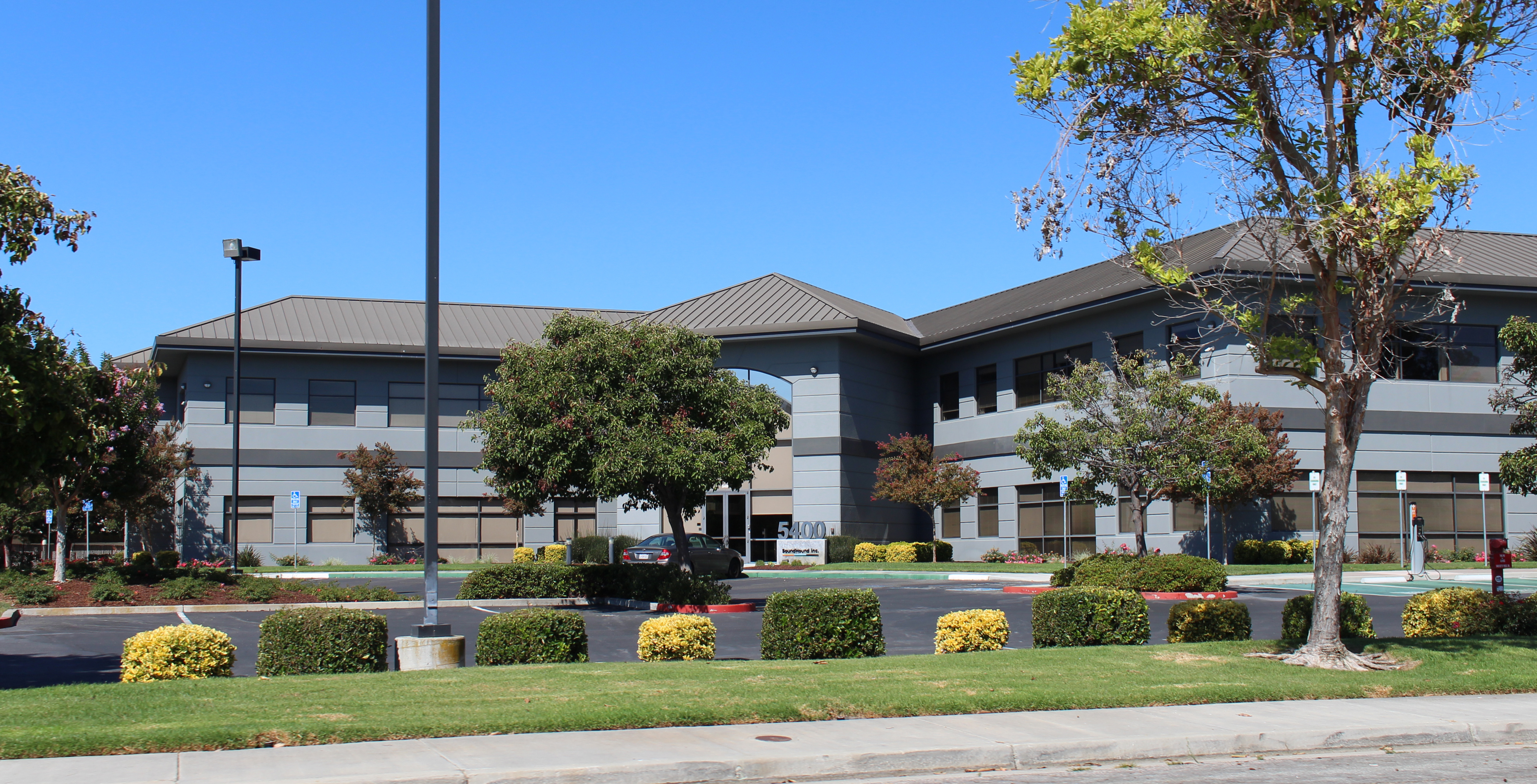
- Headquarters in Santa Clara
- Formerly: Melodis Corp
- Type: Public
- Traded as: Nasdaq: SOUN
- Industry: Speech Recognition; Mobile Technology
- Founded: September 2005; 21 years ago
- Founders: Keyvan Mohajer; Majid Emami; James Hom
- Headquarters: Santa Clara, California, United States
- Products: Automatic content recognition; Speech recognition; Voice user interfaces; Chatbots
- Revenue: ▲US$84.7 million (2024)
- Number of employees: 700 (2024)
- Website: soundhound.com

SoundHound AI, Inc. (Nasdaq: SOUN) is an American music and speech recognition company based in Santa Clara, California. It was originally founded as Melodis in 2005 before rebranding to SoundHound Inc. in 2010, and SoundHound AI in 2022.

SoundHound provides voice-recognition and synthesis software for use in business and sales applications, such as drive-through restaurants.

== History ==
The company was founded in 2005 as Melodis Corp by Keyvan Mohajer, Majid Emami, and James Hom. The company initially focused on music recognition as a competitor to the Shazam app.

In 2009, the company's music discovery app Midomi was rebranded as SoundHound but was still available as a web version on midomi.com until February 2025. The app grew from 2 million users in January 2010 to 100 million users in September 2012.

In 2010, the company formally rebranded from Melodis Corp. to SoundHound.

In 2015, Hyundai Motors began offering the SoundHound music recognition app in the infotainment systems of some Hyundai and Kia models.

In December 2015, SoundHound launched Houndify, a voice interface for other products and services.

In April 2022, coinciding with its listing on NASDAQ via a SPAC merger, the company rebranded from SoundHound to SoundHound AI.

In December 2023, SoundHound acquired SYNQ3 Restaurant Solutions, a provider of voice AI for restaurants, for $25 million.

In 2023–2024, SoundHound began providing voice AI phone ordering technology to various restaurant chains, starting with Jersey Mike's Subs and White Castle. The company's customer base also includes several other chain restaurants. In October 2024, SoundHound claimed their phone ordering technology had processed over 100 million interactions with restaurant customers.

In June 2024, SoundHound acquired Allset, a restaurant ordering marketplace founded out of Ukraine.

In August 2024, SoundHound acquired Amelia AI for $85 million.

In September 2025, it was announced that SoundHound had completed its acquisition of Interactions LLC, a company which also developed AI for the customer service market.

== Funding ==
By June 2015, SoundHound had raised a total of $40 million across several funding rounds, with investments from Global Catalyst Partners, Translink Capital, Walden Venture Capital, and others.

In January 2017, the company raised another $75 million in an investment round that included Nvidia, Samsung, Kleiner Perkins Caulfield & Byers, and others.

In January 2018, the valuation of the company reached $1 billion. Announced in May 2018, SoundHound raised $100 million from a funding round led by Tencent.

On April 28, 2022, after merging with Archimedes Tech SPAC Partners at a valuation of $2.1 billion, SoundHound AI went public, listed under the symbol SOUN on the Nasdaq.

In November 2022, the company implemented a 10% workforce reduction and salary adjustments. Reports at the time indicated that SoundHound had secured less than half of the anticipated funds from its SPAC merger. In January 2023, the company reduced its workforce by approximately 50%.

In April 2023, SoundHound secured $100 million in strategic financing.

In February 2025, Nvidia disclosed in a regulatory filing that it had sold its stake in SoundHound.

== Awards and recognition ==
SoundHound won the 2020 Webby Award for Productivity (Voice) in the category Apps, Mobile & Voice.

== See also ==
- Artificial intelligence
- Generative AI
- Speech recognition
- Natural language understanding
