= Home theater in a box =

Type of home entertainment system

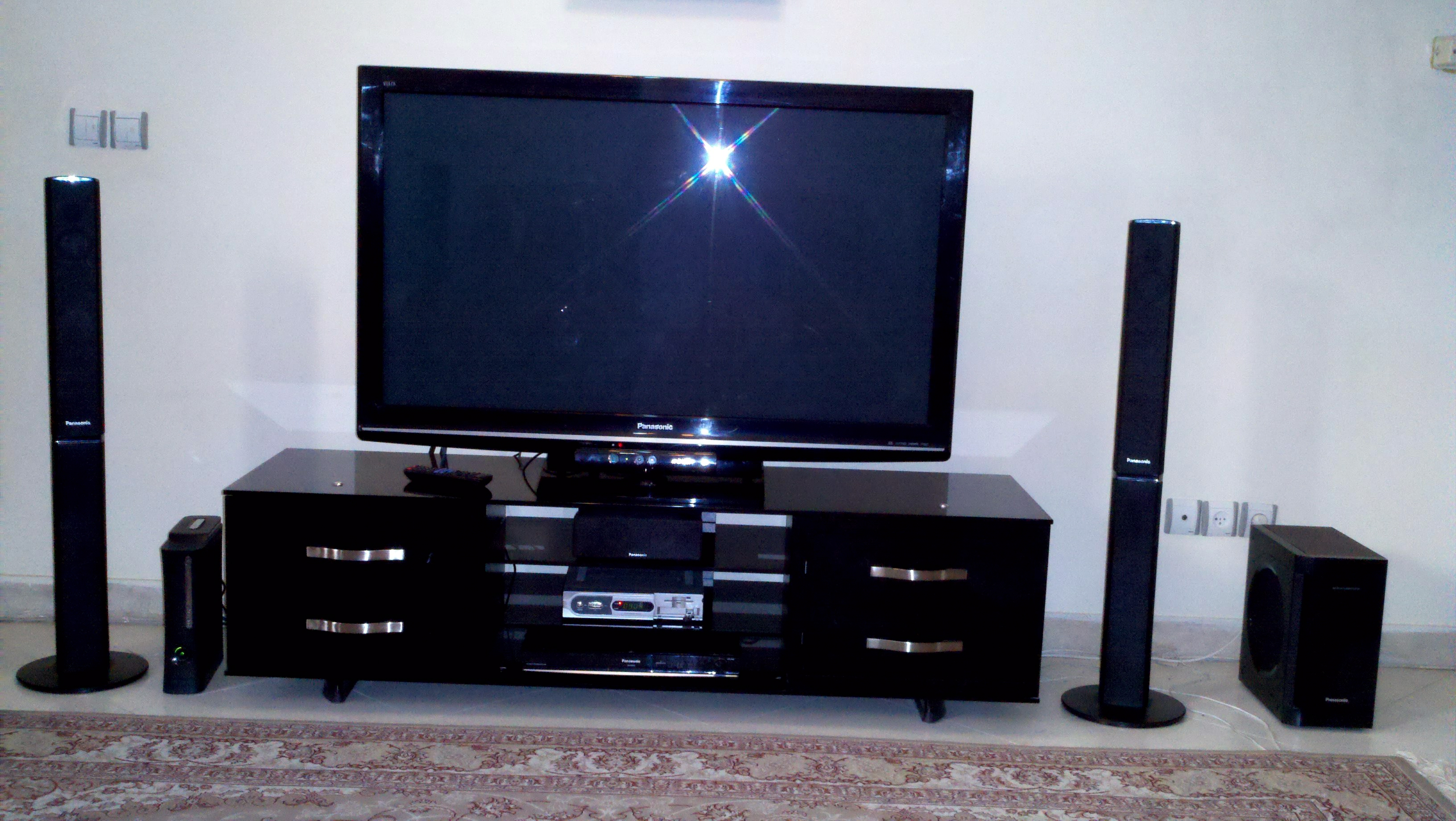
A mid-priced Panasonic Home Theatre in a Box package, which consists of the DVD player, which contains an integrated multi-channel power amplifier, and a set of speakers. The consumer must buy the television and stand separately.

A home theater in a box (HTIB) is an integrated home theater package which "bundles" together a combination DVD or Blu-ray player, a multi-channel amplifier (which includes a surround sound decoder, a radio tuner, and other features), speaker wires, connection cables, a remote control, a set of five or more surround sound speakers (or more rarely, just left and right speakers, a lower-price option known as "2.1") and a low-frequency subwoofer cabinet. Manufacturers also have come out with the "soundbar", an all in one device to put underneath the television and that contains all the speakers in one unit.

== Market positioning ==
HTIBs are marketed as an "all-in-one" way for consumers to enjoy the surround sound experience of home cinema, even if they do not want to, or do not have the electronics "know-how", to pick out all of the components one-by-one and connect the cables. If a consumer were to buy all of the items individually, they would have to have a basic knowledge of electronics, so they could, for example, ensure that the speakers were of compatible impedance and power-handling for the amplifier. As well, the consumer would have to ensure that they purchased all of the different connection cables, which could include HDMI cables, optical connectors, speaker wire, and RCA connectors.

On the downside, most HTIBs lack the features and "tweakability" of home theater components which are sold separately. For example, while a standalone home theater amplifier may offer extensive equalization options, a HTIB amplifier may simply provide a few factory-set EQ presets. As well, while a standalone home theatre subwoofer may contain a range of sound-shaping circuitry, such as a crossover control, a phase inversion switch, and a parametric equalizer, a HTIB subwoofer system usually has its crossover point set at the factory, which means that the user cannot change it. In some cases, the factory preset crossover point on an HTIB subwoofer may cause it to sound too "boomy" in a room.

== Features ==
A typical HTIB generally consists of a central receiver unit which usually contains a DVD player (some systems separate the DVD player into a separate unit), a multi-channel power amplifier and a series of speakers for surround sound use, generally including a subwoofer. Some HTIB systems also have a radio tuner or an Internet-based streaming audio platform (e.g. Spotify). The least expensive systems usually have a passive subwoofer, which is amplified by the receiver unit. HTIB systems do not include a television set or monitor with which to display the visual material or a stand to place the receiver unit on. Beside auxiliary inputs, many of them are equipped today with HDMI with ARC, optical and SPDIF inputs. Some HTIB systems are also equipped with a phono input, to allow the connection of a turntable with magnetic cartridge. However such systems are not suitable for vinyl playing as they are mainly focused on movies and rarely for high fidelity. Some home theaters are just stereo or 2.1, but even so, they are not intended as hi-fi, this is just a marketing strategy.

There are systems in this class that are sold without a DVD player and are designed to integrate with existing video setups where there is already one, such as a DVD recorder or a DVD/VCR combo unit. The speaker cabinets supplied with most systems in this class are generally fairly small compared to typical stereo speakers, and are meant for wall- or shelf-mounting in tight spaces. There are some systems in this class that are supplied with slim freestanding speakers that stand on the floor. This may be typical of higher-priced systems that are equipped with more powerful amplifiers, or most of the "receiver-only" packages that do not come with a DVD player.

Some HTIBs use proprietary connectors between components, sometimes even combining several different wires into one connector, to reduce cable clutter and increase the ease of installation. However, this can impede interoperability between different audio/visual devices and makes upgrading certain parts impossible. This may also be used by manufacturers to limit what a consumer can do with a low-end model and encourage them to upgrade should they want more autonomy.

A few manufacturers, notably Sony and Panasonic, have implemented wireless connection technology for the surround speakers in this class of equipment. This technology may be available as standard with some of the high-priced models, or may be supplied as an aftermarket kit that only works with selected models in the manufacturer's range. It usually uses a line-level feed over a proprietary wireless link to a separate power amplifier used for the surround-sound channels. This link-receiver and power amplifier can be built into one of the surround speakers or housed in a black box that the surround speakers are connected to. Some higher-end HTIB models offer additional features such as 1080i or 4K (mainly versions with Blu-ray) video resolution upscaling, a 5-disc platter, HDMI inputs, USB connectivity, Bluetooth support, Wi-fi support, Internet apps, DAB and DAB+, mirroring possibility, iPod dock and a hard disk for recording TV shows.

Some older HTIBs from the 1990s had a built-in VCR, besides a DVD, along with a TV tuner, and a hard disk for recording TV shows.
