= Sound recognition =

Pattern recognition for audio signals

Sound recognition is a technology, which is based on both traditional pattern recognition theories and audio signal analysis methods. Sound recognition technologies contain preliminary data processing, feature extraction and classification algorithms. Sound recognition can classify feature vectors. Feature vectors are created as a result of preliminary data processing and linear predictive coding.

Sound recognition technologies are used for:

- Music recognition
- Speech recognition
- Automatic alarm detection and identification for surveillance, monitoring systems, based on the acoustic environment
- Assistance to disabled or elderly people affected in their hearing capabilities
- Identifying species of animals such as fish and mammals, e.g. in acoustical oceanography

== Security ==
In monitoring and security, an important contribution to alarm detection and alarm verification can be supplied, using sound recognition techniques. In particular, these methods could be helpful for intrusion detection in places like offices, stores, private homes or for the supervision of public premises exposed to person aggression. In all these cases, a recognition system can report about a danger or distress event. It could further identify sounds like glass break, doorbells, smoke detector alarms, red alerts, human screams, baby cries and others. Sometimes, the alarm is triggered by other detectors (e.g. temperature or video-based) and the sound recognizer would be associated with these other modalities, to verify the alarm, with the purpose of decreasing the global false alarm detection rate.

== Assistance ==
Solutions based on a sound recognition technology can offer assistance to disabled and elderly people affected in hearing capabilities, helping them to keep or recover some independence in their daily occupations.

== Companies ==
There are only a handful of companies who are working on sound recognition technology:

- AbiliSense (Generic sound recognition technology for a wide variety of use cases, mainly safety and security, and functional in environments such as: home and city).
- Audio Analytic (AI company whose "Embedded sound recognition AI software gives consumer technology, such as smart speakers, hearables, smart home tech, mobile phones and automotive, a sense of hearing." has sound recognition software that makes consumer products more intelligent).
- OtoSense (checking sounds of engines).
- Wavio (software and product innovation company providing sound recognition solutions to clients such as product manufacturers, organizations, and government inclusive of accessibility for Deaf & hard of hearing, protected by sound recognition patents covering sound recognition to notify users of detected sounds automatically).

== See also ==
- Acoustic fingerprint
- Shazam (music app)
