= List of Android launchers =

An Android launcher is a software application for Android that contains the home screen and are responsible for starting other apps and hosting live widgets.

== List ==
Application name	Developer	Availability			License	Cost	API	Nr. of store installs	Note
Application name	Developer	Google Play	F-Droid	Amazon Appstore	License	Cost	API	Nr. of store installs	Note
Action Launcher	Chris Lacy	Yes	No	?	Proprietary	Free/Paid	4.1+	1,000,000+	
ADW Launcher	AnderWeb	Yes	Yes	?	Proprietary (Last open source release was version 1.3.6)	Free	1.6+	10,000,000+	
AT4K Launcher	Overdevs	Yes	No	No	Proprietary	Free/Paid	8.1+	50,000+	Android TV Launcher
CMM Launcher	CMM Launcher	Yes	No	No	Proprietary	Free/Paid	5.0+	10,000,000+	
ADWLauncher EX	AnderWeb	Yes	No	?	Proprietary	Paid	1.6+		
Apex Launcher	Android Does	Yes	No	?	Proprietary	Free/Paid	4.0+	10,000,000+	
APUS Launcher	APUS Group	Yes	No	Yes	Proprietary	Free	4.0.3+		
Atom Launcher	dlto	Yes	No	?	Proprietary	Free	4.0.2+		
Aviate	Yahoo	No	No	?	Proprietary (support ends 3/8/2018)	Free	2.3+		
Before Launcher	Before Labs	Yes	No	?	Proprietary	Free/Paid	7.0+	25,000+	
BIG Launcher	BIG dev. team	Yes	No	?	Proprietary	Free/Paid	2.1+		Launcher suitable for seniors and visually impaired users.
Buzz Launcher	Buzz dev. team	Yes	No	?	Proprietary	Free	4.0.3+		
C Launcher	C dev. team	Yes	No	No	Proprietary	Free	4.0+	10,000,000+	
C Launcher 3D	Moboapps team	Yes	No	No	Proprietary	Free	4.0+	100,000+	
Catapult Launcher	Kane O'Riley	No	Yes	?	Apache License 2.0	Free	5.0+	10,000+	Note: No longer maintained
Chameleon Launcher	Teknision	Yes	No	?	Proprietary	Paid	3.2+		
CM Launcher	Cheetah Mobile	Yes	No	Yes	Proprietary	Free	4.0+		
DUOWEB Simple Launcher	DUOWEB.net	Yes	No	No	Proprietary	Free	6.0+		Motto: always free / no ads / no tracking / no features, just simple launcher for everyday use
Espier Launcher	Espier Studios	No	No	?	Proprietary	Free/Paid	2.2+		
EverythingMe	Fly Apps	Yes	No	No	Proprietary	Free	2.2+	10,000,000+	Contextual launcher with extensive search capabilities and customization options
Evie Launcher	Evie Labs	No	No	No	Proprietary	Free	4.4+	1,000,000+	Minimal launcher that focuses on fast search across apps
Facebook Home	Meta	Yes	No	?	Proprietary	Free	4.0+		
GO Launcher	GO dev. team	Yes	No	?	Proprietary	Free/Paid	2.0+	100,000,000+	
Google Now Launcher	Google	Yes	No	?	Proprietary	Free	4.1+	50,000,000+	Default on Nexus devices.
HayaiLauncher	seizonsenryaku	No	Yes	?	Apache License 2.0	Free	4.0.3+	1,000+	Source available on GitHub. Note: No longer maintained.
Hola Launcher	Holaverse	Yes	No	?	Proprietary	Free	2.3.3+	100,000,000+	
Pixel Launcher	Google	Yes	No	No	Proprietary	Free	5.0+		
Infinity Launcher	TankheSoft	Yes	No	?	Proprietary	Paid	4.4+		
Kids Place - Parental Control	Kiddoware	Yes	No	Yes	Proprietary	Free	2.1+		
KISS Launcher	Neamar	Yes	Yes	?	MIT License	Free	2.3.3+	100,000+	Source available on GitHub.
Kvaesitso	MM2-0	No	Yes	No	GNU General Public License	Free	8.0+		Source available on GitHub.
LauncherPro	Frederico Carnales	Yes	No	?	Proprietary	Free/Paid	2.0+		
Microsoft Launcher	Microsoft	Yes	No	No	Proprietary	Free	5.0+	50,000,000+	Formerly known as Arrow Launcher
Launcher <3	Jason Kung	Yes	?	?	Apache License 2.0	Free	4.2+ (17-26)	1,000,000+	
LaunchTime	Quaap	No	Yes	No	GNU General Public License	Free	4.3+		Source available on GitHub.
Lawnchair Launcher	paphonb, Patryk Michalik, Amogh Lele, David Sn	Yes	Yes	No	GNU General Public License	Free	5.0+	1,000,000+	
LessPhone Launcher	Aswin Mohan	Yes	No	Yes	Proprietary	Free	5.0+	50,000+	
Librechair Launcher	Po Lu	No	No	No	GNU General Public License	Free	5.0+		
Lightning Launcher	PierroX	Yes	No	?	Proprietary	Free	2.0+		
LINE Launcher	LINE & Camp Mobile	Yes	No	?	Proprietary	Free	4.0.3+		Previously named Dodol Launcher.
Nemus Launcher	Nemustech	Yes	No	?	Proprietary	Free	2.1+		
Nova Launcher	TeslaCoil Software	Yes	No	?	Proprietary	Free/Paid	4.0+	50,000,000+	
Nova Launcher Prime	TeslaCoil Software	Yes	No	?	Proprietary	Paid	4.0+		
Nothing OS launcher	Nothing	Yes	No	No	Proprietary	Free	8.0+	10,000+	Released on April 27, 2022. Currently on Beta. Currently works on Samsung Galaxy S21, S22, and Google Pixel 5 and 6 series devices. Support on OnePlus Devices to be made available soon. Default on the Nothing Phone 1.
Niagara Launcher	Peter Huber	Yes	No	Yes	Proprietary	Free	5.0+	5,000,000+	
OpenLauncher	OL dev. team	Yes	Yes	?	Apache License 2.0	Free	4.1+	1,000+	Source available on GitHub. Focus on community and features. Note: No longer maintained
Pear Launcher	Yajat Kumar	Yes	No	No	Proprietary	Free/Paid	5.0+	500,000+	Pear Launcher is a Launcher designed for performance and customization.
Pear Launcher Pro	Yajat Kumar	Yes	No	No	Proprietary	Paid	5.0+		Pear Launcher Pro is license to unlock paid features in Pear Launcher.
Peek Launcher	Waffle Ware Apps	Yes	?	?	Proprietary	Free/Paid	4.1+	50,000	Primary feature is an always-visible T9 keyboard to search for apps and contacts.
Phonotto	DuckMa Srl	Yes	No	?	Proprietary	Free/Paid	4.0.3+		Launcher suitable for seniors and visually impaired users.
POCO Launcher	Xiaomi Inc.	Yes	No	?	Proprietary	Free	8.0+	100,000,000+	POCO Launcher have app drawer with customizable categories. Stock launcher on POCO smartphones.
QM Launcher	Quantum Matrix Holdings LLC.	Yes	No	?	Proprietary	Free/Paid	2.3+		
Ratio	Blloc GmbH	Yes	No	No	Proprietary	Free	2.9+	100,000+	Minimal launcher with a messaging app called Tree and some cards e.g. A calculator and A Spotify card.
Showself Launcher	NQ Mobile	Yes	No	?	Proprietary	Free	4.0+		
Smart Launcher	Smart Launcher Team	Yes	No	?	Proprietary	Free/Paid	4.2+	10,000,000+	
Solo Launcher	NewBornTown	Yes	No	Yes	Proprietary	Free	4.0+		
SPB Shell 3D	SPB Software	Yes	No	?	Proprietary	Paid	2.0+		
Square Home	ChYK the dev.	Yes	No	No	Proprietary	Free/Paid	4.0.3+		
Themer	MyColorScreen	Yes	No	?	Proprietary	Free	4.1+		
Trebuchet Launcher	LineageOS / CyanogenMod team	No	No	?	Apache License 2.0	Free	5.0+ (API level 21)		Source available on GitHub.
TSF Launcher 3D	Launcher 3D Pro	Yes	No	Yes	Proprietary	Free	2.2+	5,000,000+	
Linux CLI Launcher	Francesco Andreuzzi	Yes	Yes	No	GNU General Public License	Free	2.3+	500,000+	Linux CLI interface launcher. Source available on GitHub.
Tube Launcher	Adnan Malik (AJK)	Yes	No	Yes	Proprietary	Free	4.0.3+	500++	
Turbo Launcher	Phonemetra	No	No	Yes	Apache License 2.0	Free	1.0+	1,000,000+	Note: No longer maintained Source available on GitHub.
Vire Launcher	Vire Labs Ltd.	Yes	No	?	Proprietary	Free/Paid	2.2+		
Wave Launcher	MobileMerit	Yes	No	?	Proprietary	Paid	2.0+		
WP Launcher	Xinyi Network	Yes	No	?	Proprietary	Free	3.0+		Formerly Launcher 8.
Yandex Launcher	Yandex	Yes	No	?	Proprietary	Free	5.0+	5,000,000+	
Z Launcher	Nokia	Yes	No	?	Proprietary	Free	4.1+	500,000+	
Zeam Launcher	Michael Bentz	Yes	No	?	Proprietary	Free	4.1+	1,000,000+	
ZIM Launcher	Saul Henriquez	No	Yes	?	Apache License 2.0	Free	5.0+		Note: No longer maintained
