= Showself =

Chinese live streaming platform

- Website type: Social networking service website
- Owners: Beijing Showself Technology Co., Ltd
- Creators: Beijing Showself Technology Co., Ltd
- Website: http://www.showself.com/
- Commercial: Yes
- Registration: Optional
- Launched: March 2010

Showself (秀色娱乐) is a live streaming video entertainment social platform in China that is growing rapidly. Broadcasters setup real-time streaming video channels for self-expression of interests such as singing, disc jockeying, live talk shows, dating, games, education and others. It is available through web browser and the App Store for iPhone, iPad and Google Play for Android. Showself also works with mobile gaming companies, modeling and casting agencies, TV stations, advertising agencies, media groups, and online video websites to create both online and offline events in order to engage users and promote virtual goods. Showself was launched by Shanghai Beijing Showself Technology Co., Ltd in March 2010 and NQ Mobile took a controlling stake in 2014. Tongfang Investment Fund Series SPC, an affiliate of Tsinghua Tongfang acquired Showself from NQ Mobile in December 2017.

== Features ==
Showself allows users to view and interact with broadcasters with online chat, virtual items and playing games.

Showself gaming largely centers simple games of chance. They enhance the user engagement within the live broadcast and facilitate virtual currency and virtual goods. Users pay to play games for a chance to hit a jackpot or win a flower that they can then send to the host which can then be turned back into money.

Showself Live Wallpaper, also known as vLife, is a promotional tool in the Chinese market used by film studios in major motion picture releases, magazine ads and other types of advertising campaigns. The mobile app presents dynamic content to the lock screen or home screen and enables users to click through to various websites in order to buy products such as movie tickets.

Showself Launcher is an Android launcher that can be used to replace the existing home screen, start other applications, and host widgets. The application enables the user to personalize settings with themes, live wallpapers, lock screens, and fonts.

== History ==
Showself started in 2010. In May 2015 NQ Mobile announced its new Showself Brand which includes Showself Live Broadcast (秀色秀场), Showself Live Wallpaper (秀色锁屏), Showself Music Radar (秀色音乐雷达) and Showself Launcher (秀色桌面).

As of September 30, 2015, Showself's live mobile social video platform reached almost 5 million monthly active users, up around 240% from year-ago levels and up around 17% sequentially. Showself Live Wallpaper had shipped on more than 200 million devices, achieved more than 93 million monthly active users up 300% year over year, and had more than 62 million daily active users up 475% year over year.

== See also ==
- Livestream
- Streaming media
- YY
