= Link Motion Inc =

Multinational technology company

Link Motion Inc.
- Type: Public
- Traded as: NYSE: LKM
- Industry: Autonomous car, Carputer, Vehicular communication systems, Mobile security, mobile games, mobile management, mobile advertising, mobile health, mobile search
- Founded: Beijing, China (2005)
- Founder: Henry Lin Yu, Dr. Vincent Shi
- Headquarters: Beijing, China; Dallas, Texas
- Area served: Worldwide
- Key people: Zemin Xu (CEO); Vincent Wenyong Shi (chairman)
- Products: NQ Mobile Security; NQ Family Guardian; NQ Mobile Vault; NQ Mobile Assurance; NQ Android Booster; NQ Call Blocker; NQ Mobile Guard
- Number of employees: 1742 (as of 12/31/2014)
- Subsidiaries: Link Motion Finland (2015-present, majority stake); Doreso (2013-2017)
- Website: www.lkmotion.com

Link Motion Inc, formerly NetQin and NQ Mobile, is a multinational technology company that develops, licenses, supports and sells software and services that focus on the smart ride business. Link Motion sells carputers for car businesses, consumer ride sharing services, as well as legacy mobile security, productivity and other related applications. Link Motion maintains dual headquarters in Dallas, Texas, United States and Beijing, China. A Court Receiver, lawyer Robert Seiden, was appointed over Link Motion in February 2019 in the United States in the federal district court in the Southern District of New York by Judge Victor Marrero. The Receiver removed Wenyong "Vincent" Shi as chairman and chief executive officer, and replaced him by appointing Mr. Lilin "Francis" Guo.

== History ==
=== 2005–2011: Founding and company beginnings ===
Link Motion was founded as NQ Mobile in 2005 by Dr. Henry Lin, formerly the youngest associate professor at the Beijing University of Posts and Telecommunications, and Dr. Vincent Shi. The company began its business by offering mobile security services and later started offering productivity products to families and enterprise customers. Their services were compatible with a wide range of handset models and almost all currently available operating systems for smartphones, including Java, Symbian, iOS, Android, Windows Phone and BlackBerry OS. NQ Mobile also collaborated closely with other mobile ecosystem participants, including chipmakers, handset manufacturers, wireless carriers, third party payment channels, retailers and other distribution channels in order to broaden the reach of their services.

NQ Mobile's initial focus was the China marketplace. The company cooperated with China Mobile, China Unicom and China Telecom, the three largest mobile companies in China. NQ Mobile also cooperated with Nokia and Sony to pre-installed NQ products on their companywide mobile phones. NQ Mobile has also worked closely with Symbian, Windows Mobile and Android, developing mobile security applications based on those operating systems. In addition, Samsung, Motorola, Dopod, Lenovo, Tencent, and Baidu have all been the company's partners.

In August 2011, Chris Stier was appointed managing director for the Americas and became responsible for NQ Mobile's business development throughout the Americas, overseeing sales and marketing operations as well as establishing strategic partnerships with key industry players in the region.

In October 2011, Geoff Casely was appointed managing director for the Europe, Middle East, and Africa (EMEA) region based in London and became responsible for NQ Mobile's business development in EMEA and building strategic partner relationships.

=== 2012–2013: International expansion ===
Omar Khan joined the company in January 2012 as co-CEO to direct the company alongside the current chairman and chief executive officer Dr. Henry Lin and the company changed its corporate name from NetQin Mobile Inc. to NQ Mobile Inc. Mr. Khan focused on the global expansion of NQ Mobile into markets such as North America, Latin America, Europe, Japan, Korea and India. Dr. Lin continued to focus on the core markets such as China and Taiwan among other developing countries.

During the first half of 2012, NQ Mobile expanded its international management with the additions of Gavin Kim as chief product officer, Kim Titus, senior director of Communication, Conrad Edwards as chief experience officer, and Victoria Repice as senior director of product management.

NQ Mobile expanded its mobile internet services in November 2012 with the acquisition of Feiliu. Feiliu was founded in 2009 and was subsequently rebranded to FL Mobile. It is a leading mobile interest-based community platform with coverage in China that engages users in real-time mobile online activities. FL Mobile provides application recommendation services, interest-based exchanges, and mobile games to its user communities. According to data published by third party marketing research company Sino MR, FL Mobile was the top iOS mobile game publisher and operator in the Chinese market in December 2012. FL Mobile had 87.3 million registered users and 16.1 million monthly active users by the end of June 2013.

EnfoDesk Analysys International (EnfoDesk), a major market tracking company, reported that FL Mobile became the number one publisher on the iOS platform and increased its market share to 36.6 percent in the first half of 2013. The first-place ranking included the top spot for both revenues and number of mobile users. The report also claims FL Mobile ranks third place across all platforms for both revenues and mobile users and maintains 18.8 percent share of total revenues in the first half of the 2013.

NQ Mobile also expanded into enterprise security products and services starting in May 2012 when it acquired 55% of NationSky and the remaining 45% in July 2013. Founded in 2005, NationSky is a leader in providing mobile services to more than 1,250 enterprises in China. By working with carriers and smart phone platform providers, NationSky delivers device agnostic managed mobile services, self developed mobile device management (MDM) software NQSky and other mobile SaaS services. Headquartered in Beijing, NationSky also has offices in Shanghai and Shenzhen.

In June 2013, NQ Mobile hired Matt Mathison to the senior management position of vice president, Capital Markets.

In August 2013, NQ Mobile opened a second global headquarters in Dallas, Texas. The company also further expanded its products and service offerings with the acquisitions of Shanghai Yinlong Information and Technology Co., Ltd. ("Yinlong") to develop content-based music information retrieval (MIR) technology based on multi platforms, NQ Mobile (Shenzhen) Co., Ltd. ("NQ Shenzhen") to offer online security education and value added services, Best Partners Ltd. ("Best Partner") for mobile advertising, Beijing Tianya Co., Ltd. ("Tianya") for mobile healthcare applications development and search engine marketing in the healthcare industry in China, Chengdu Ruifeng Technology Co., Ltd. ("Ruifeng") to provide enterprise mobility system development and iOS training programs, Tianjin Huayong Wireless Technology Co., Ltd. ("Huayong ") for research and development and marketing of live wallpapers for smart phones using the Android operating system, and expanded its market with NQ Mobile KK ("NQ Japan") in Japan.

=== 2014–2015: Consolidation and divestments ===
In 2014 NQ Mobile continued expanding through acquisitions with Beijing Trustek Technology Co., Ltd. ("Trustek") to provide enterprise mobility services, including system management, application development, business intelligence and maintenance services, Yipai Tianxia Network Technology Co., Ltd. ("Yipai") to provide mobile intelligent interactive advertising services, through integration of media channels of outdoor, newspapers, magazines etc., Beijing Showself Technology Co., Ltd. ("Showself") to provide entertainment and dating platforms on mobile internet, and established Beijing NQ Mobile Co., Ltd. ("NQ Yizhuang") to engage in software design and development for computer and mobile devices and other technology consulting services. The company also took a controlling stake in Link Motion.

In May 2015, Mr. Zemin Xu took over as CEO and the company held a press conference in Beijing to announce their new business strategy and reorganized along two lines, a technical division representing mobile security, mobile enterprise and mobile health care, and an entertainment division covering mobile advertising, mobile entertainment and mobile games. During the conference NQ Mobile also announced its new Showself Entertainment brand which includes Showself, Showself Live Wallpaper, Showself Music Radar and Showself Launcher. In June 2015, Mr. Roland Wu was appointed as chief financial officer.

In August 2015 the company along with the other existing shareholders of FL Mobile Inc. agreed to sell to Beijing Jinxing Rongda Investment Management Co. Ltd., a subsidiary of Tsinghua Holdings Co., Ltd, the entire stake in FL Mobile Inc. that they currently hold for no less than RMB 4 billion (or approximately no less than US$626 million) and also the sale of all of NQ Mobile's interest in Beijing NationSky Network Technology Co., Ltd., to Mr. Hou Shuli, a founder and senior management member of Beijing NationSky, for an aggregate consideration of US$80 million. The company completed the divestment of NationSky for $80 million at the end of 2015.

=== 2016–Present: Business transformation ===
Throughout 2016 NQ Mobile continued to consolidate and began shifting its core business to smart cars while working on the divestments of FL Mobile and other businesses. On March 30, 2017, the company announced a new agreement to sell FL Mobile for RMB 4 billion along with Beijing Showself for RMB 1.23 million to Tongfang Investment Fund Series SPC, an affiliate of Tsinghua Tongfang. The divestment of FL Mobile and Beijing Showself was completed in December 2017.

In January 2018, NQ Mobile announced that its board of directors approved a rebranding effort around its new focus as a vehicular automation and mobility as a service company by change its name from "NQ Mobile Inc." to "Link Motion Inc." and its ticker from "NQ" to "LKM."

In February 2018, the company hired MZ Group for investor relations and financial communications across all key markets and changed its name to Link Motion Inc. and their ticker to LKM.

In March 2018, Link Motion Inc. appointed Mr. Duo Tang to executive vice president and the head of the company's smart ride business.

In February 2019, the federal court in New York appointed Robert W. Seiden, a lawyer and former prosecutor, as Receiver over Link Motion to preserve the assets of the company. Seiden was also appointed receiver over LKM and its subsidiaries in Hong Kong by the High Court of the Hong Kong Special Administrative Region Court of the First Instance, along with Lauren Lau of KLC. The Receiver removed Wenyong "Vincent" Shi as chairman and chief executive officer of Link Motion and replaced him by appointing Mr. Lilin "Francis" Guo.

== Products ==
=== Mobile value added services ===
- Freemium products including NQ Mobile Security Applications, Vault and Family Guardian.

=== Advertising ===
Revenue sources include third-party application referrals from mobile applications, banner ads and intelligent interactive advertising services through user modeling and image recognition technology to search for advertisers' products and services that are of potential interest.

=== Enterprise mobility ===
Trustek offers mobility strategy consulting, architecture design, hardware and software procurement and deployment, mobile device and application management, training, maintenance and other ongoing support services to enterprise customers.

== Timeline of key events ==
=== 2005–2011 ===
In October 2005, the company launched its first mobile security product NetQin 1.0.

In November 2009, The 2009 China Frost & Sullivan Award for Mobile Security Market Leadership of the year was presented to NetQin Tech. Co., Ltd. (NetQin) for its leading market share in China mobile security market, continued commitment and excellence in R&D, and outstanding contribution to the industry.

In May 2011, The company announced that its initial public offering of 7,750,000 American depositary shares ("ADSs"), each representing five Class A common shares of the company, was priced at $11.50 per ADS, with a total offering size of US$89.125 million, assuming no exercise of the over-allotment option.

On May 5, 2011, NQ Mobile started trading on the New York Stock Exchange (NYSE) under the symbol "NQ".

In July 2011, NQ Mobile reached 100 Million registered users nearly 100% growth since June, 2010 and signed a framework agreement with Telefónica, S.A. (Telefónica) to provide mobile Internet services to the subscribers of Telefónica. Under the agreement, NQ Mobile's mobile internet services will be integrated in Telefónica's and its subsidiary's App Store and in mobile devices distributed by Telefónica and subsidiaries.

In September 2011, NQ Mobile and Brightstar Corp. signed a global go-to-market agreement to promote adoption of NQ Mobile security products. The company also opened the NQ Mobile Security Research Center based in Raleigh, N.C. led by Dr. Xuxian Jiang, who was appointed chief scientist.

=== 2012–2015 ===
In January 2012, NetQin launched its new "NQ Mobile" brand, under which it now conducts all of its international business, and announced plans to change the company's corporate name from NetQin Mobile Inc. to NQ Mobile Inc. The company also signed an agreement to pre-install NQ Mobile Security on Motorola Android smartphones in China and released a new version of its antivirus software, Mobile Security V6.0 for Android.

In February 2012, NQ Mobile integrated the BlueVia payment API from Telefónica, providing a mobile payment option to Telefónica's subscribers.

In April 2012, NQ Mobile announced that The Cellular Connection (TCC) will offer NQ Mobile Security at more than 800 Verizon Wireless Premium Retail locations across the U.S. Rollout of this program will begin with availability at TCC's nearly 300 corporate stores.

In May 2012, NQ Mobile visited the NYSE to celebrate the company's 1-year anniversary of listing on the NYSE. In honor of the occasion, Omar Khan and Yu Lin, CO-CEOs of NQ Mobile, rang The Closing Bell. The company also acquired 55% of Beijing NationSky Network Technology, Inc. ("NationSky"), a provider of mobile services to enterprises in China and signed a collaboration agreement with A Wireless to offer NQ Mobile Guard in more than 125 Verizon Wireless Premium Retail locations in the US.

In August 2012, NQ Mobile and MediaTek Inc. reached an agreement regarding NQ Mobile's acquisition of approximately one-third interest in Hesine Technologies International Worldwide Inc. ("Hesine"), a wholly owned subsidiary of MediaTek and a premier mobile messaging provider. NQ Mobile's co-founder, chairman and co-CEO, Henry Lin joined the board of directors of Hesine. The company also announced the launch of NQ Mobile Vault for iPhone.

In September 2012, NQ Mobile announced the launch of NQ Family Guardian.

In November 2012, acquired Beijing Feiliu Jiutian Technology Co. ("Feiliu") and later rebranded it to FL Mobile. The company also announced that epay Australia, a Division of Euronet Worldwide, Inc. (NASDAQ: EEFT), will offer NQ Mobile Guard in major retail locations across Australia, including Harvey Norman and Allphones, UK retailer Phones 4u will offer NQ Mobile Security at over 600 retail locations across the UK.

In December 2012, NQ Mobile announced the launch of a proprietary security check service for HTC's App Store in mainland China.

In July 2013, NQ Mobile agrees to purchase the remaining 45 percent stake in its subsidiary, NationSky.

In September 2013, NQ Mobile announced the release of "Music Radar," a content-based music information retrieval (MIR) application from one of its subsidiaries, Yinlong making the app available in China for both Android and iOS platforms. The app was later renamed Doreso.

In October 2013, NQ's stock "fell a shattering 47 percent", followed by lawsuits. The short-seller research firm Muddy Waters LLC alleged that "at least 72 percent of the company's revenue in China is fictitious and that its actual market share in China is 1.5 percent instead of 55 percent that it had claimed". An independent investigation conducted by an independent special committee of its board of directors and carried out by its independent counsel Shearman & Sterling LLP and Deloitte & Touche Financial Advisory Services Limited acting as forensic accountants found the companies disclosures were verifiable. However, in April 2015, the co-CEO of NQ Mobile, Omar Khan, stepped down after the stock had fallen nearly 84 percent.

== Reception ==
NQ Mobile Security and NQ Family Guardian were both selected as top 25 apps at the Mobile Apps Showdown for CES 2013 in December, 2012.

NQ Mobile was granted the 2011 Technology Pioneer Award by the World Economic Forum for its technology leadership and innovation in mobile security. "The company's heavy investment in R&D has resulted in 23 patented and patent-pending technologies, giving the company a leading edge in the burgeoning mobile security market."

Time Magazine named the company one of the "10 Start-Ups That Will Change Your Life" in September 2010.

NQ Mobile Security was selected as a top 20 app at the Global Mobile Internet Conference Silicon Valley (GMIC SV) in October 2012. In addition, NQ Mobile Vault for Android was selected as a top 100 app.

Deloitte Technology Fast 50 (2010)

== Reviews and analysis of products ==
NQ Mobile Security received 4 out of 5 stars when reviewed by PC Advisor.

NQ Mobile Vault received 4 out of 5 star, both from CNet and from PC Magazines.

Muddy Waters Research accused NQ Mobile of fraud in a 2013 report, alleging inflated revenues and misrepresented operations.

In April 2015 an analysis of the NQ Vault product indicated that it only encrypted the first 128 bytes of the data, leaving the rest unencrypted. NQ Mobile responded by saying that the encryption level was "appropriate".

== Partnerships ==
In August 2011, NQ Mobile and MediaTek reached an agreement on mobile security cooperation whereby MediaTek will make NQ Mobile's mobile security service available to the MediaTek's smartphone chipset. The company also signed an agreement with Taiwan Mobile to provide mobile anti-virus services to Taiwan Mobile subscribers in Taiwan.

In June 2012, NQ Mobile announced an alliance with TDMobility, the joint U.S. venture between Brightstar Corp and Tech Data Corporation. The collaboration will enable TDMobility to bring NQ Enterprise Shield to Tech Data's network of 65,000 Value Added Resellers across the US, serving small, medium, and large businesses. The company also announced the official global launch of NQ Enterprise Shield and scientists from NQ Mobile's Mobile Security Research Center, in collaboration with North Carolina State University disclosed a new way to detect mobile threats without relying on known malware samples and their signatures.

In October 2012, NQ Mobile announced that its applications, including NQ Mobile Guard, NQ Mobile Vault for Android and NQ Family Guardian, will be offered by GoWireless at more than 350 and Wireless at more than 80 Verizon Wireless Premium Retail locations across the United States.
