= Music Fights Fraud Alliance =

- Music Fights Fraud Alliance
- Nickname: MFFA
- Formation: 2023
- Founder: Michael Lewan
- Type: NGO, 501(c)(3)
- Location: USA
- Products: Music
- Methods: identifying and disrupting fraudulent activities across streaming platforms
- Website: https://musicfightsfraud.com/

Music Fights Fraud Alliance (MFFA) is a global nonprofit organization established in June 2023 to combat streaming fraud within the music industry. The alliance represents a collaborative effort among various stakeholders, including digital service providers, music distributors, rights holders, and technology partners, to address fraudulent activities such as bot-driven streaming, click farms, and other deceptive practices that undermine the integrity of digital music platforms.

== History ==
The MFFA was co-founded by TuneCore and its parent company Believe, alongside Downtown Music Holdings, CD Baby, DistroKid, UnitedMasters, Symphonic, EMPIRE, Vydia, and digital service providers Spotify and Amazon Music.

This coalition was formed in response to the growing concern over artificial streaming, which has been estimated to result in significant revenue losses for legitimate artists and rights holders. The alliance aims to ensure a fair and transparent digital music ecosystem by detecting, preventing, mitigating, and enforcing anti-fraud measures.

In February 2025, Michael Lewan was appointed as the first executive director of MFFA. Lewan, previously the managing director of State and Federal Advocacy at the Recording Academy, leads the organization's strategic initiatives and operations from Washington, D.C.

=== Mission and objectives ===
MFFA's mission is to create a fair and transparent digital music ecosystem by addressing streaming fraud. The alliance focuses on identifying and disrupting fraudulent activities across streaming platforms, promoting cross-platform collaboration and data sharing among industry stakeholders, advocating for policies that support fair compensation for artists and rights holders, and developing and implementing technological solutions to detect and prevent streaming fraud.

=== Membership ===
MFFA comprises over 40 member organizations, including digital service providers such as Spotify, Amazon Music, YouTube Music, SoundCloud, and Meta; distributors and rights holders like TuneCore, Believe, CD Baby, FUGA, DistroKid, UnitedMasters, Symphonic, EMPIRE, Vydia, ONErpm, Revelator, STEM, Too Lost, Identity Music, Random Sounds, and Merlin; and technology partners including ACRCloud, Trolley, Vobile, and Audible Magic. Membership is subject to approval, and the alliance continues to expand its network to include additional entities aligned with its mission.

== Initiatives and activities ==
In 2025, MFFA launched its Partner Program to foster collaboration among industry stakeholders. The inaugural partners ACRCloud, Trolley, Vobile, and Audible Magic, work closely with MFFA and its members to share knowledge and resources, contributing to anti-fraud initiatives and projects. This program aims to create additional opportunities for the music industry to share resources and work together to create a healthier, more sustainable industry on behalf of legitimate artists around the world.

The leadership also has been organizing multiple talks and speaking panes on SXSW and many other industry events.

MFFA collaborates with the National Cyber-Forensics and Training Alliance (NCFTA), a nonprofit organization that facilitates multi-party cooperation to identify, mitigate, and disrupt cybercrime. This partnership enables MFFA members to access and share a shared database of identified fraud markers, enhancing their ability to detect and respond to fraudulent activities in real time.
