= Henry Lin =

Henry Lin may refer to:

- Henry Lin (astronomer) (born 1995), American astronomer
- Henry Lin (businessman) (fl. 2000s–2010s), Chinese businessman

== See also ==
- Henry Lien (fl. 2010s–2020s), author of speculative fiction and non-fiction
- Henry Line (fl. 1880s–1930s), Archdeacon of Waterford
- Henry Lynn (1895–1984), Polish-American film director, screenwriter, and producer
- Henry Lin, fictional character in American television series Sons of Anarchy
