= Yandex Launcher =

Free Android GUI for smartphones

- Yandex Launcher, running on a Huawei Y6 before its discontinuation in 2022
- Developer(s): Yandex
- Initial release: October 6, 2015; 9 years ago
- Final release: 2.4.0 / August 1, 2022; 2 years ago
- Operating system: Android 5.0+
- Available in: Multiple languages
- Type: Operating system shell
- License: Freeware
- Website: yandexlauncher.com

Yandex Launcher (Russian: Я́ндекс.Ло́нчер) was a free GUI for organizing the workspace on Android smartphones.

== Functionality ==
According to The Next Web, one of the main distinguishing features of Yandex Launcher is the built-in recommendation service. Machine learning technology provides the basis of the recommendation service, with which Launcher selects apps, games, videos and other forms of content that might interest the user. The key elements of Launcher are the content feed of personal recommendations by Yandex Zen, as well as a system of recommended apps; both elements are built into Launcher and analyze the user's favorite websites and other aspects of their behavior with the aim of creating a unique model of the user's preferences.

Other features of Launcher are: themes for the interface, wallpaper collections, fast search of contacts, apps and sites, search by app icon color, "smart" folders and widgets, built-in notifications on icons, screen manager, a visual editor grid for icons, etc.

== History ==
In 2009, SPB Software published the SPB Mobile Shell application. The application won several accolades.

In 2011, SPB Software was purchased by Yandex. Through this, Yandex acquired the rights to the company's products, including SPB Shell 3D (a paid application).

After the purchase by Yandex, the shell has become "Yandex.Shell". The company's services were built into it, and it was distributed for free for users from Russia and other countries.

In 2014, Yandex released a modified Android firmware, which was given the name Yandex.Kit. The firmware was tightly integrated with Yandex services. One of the standard apps supplied with the firmware was the launcher that was based on Yandex.Shell. Yandex.Kit was preinstalled, in particular, on Huawei smartphones.

On October 6, 2015, the Yandex Launcher GUI was released. Despite the fact that the developers of Yandex.Shell and Yandex.Kit took part in the creation of Launcher, these projects have little in common. Unlike Launcher, Kit was focused on enterprise applications and was not distributed through Google Play. Shell had a different monetization scheme and different geographical distribution.

On October 8, 2015, Google Play accidentally blocked Yandex Launcher. A few hours later Launcher was unblocked.

After its launch, the app was available only to users from Latin America, later it was unlocked for users from the EU, United States, Russia and other countries. On December 14, 2015, the app was made available without geographical limitations.

In October 2016, Yandex offered the pre-installation of their apps (including Yandex Launcher) to retailers and manufacturers of Android smartphones. Participating in this program was MTS (Russia), Multilaser (Brazil), ZTE (China), Wileyfox (United Kingdom), Posh Mobile and others.

At the start of 2016, the service's foreign audience was three times bigger than the Russian audience.

Somewhere in 2023–2024, Yandex Launcher was discontinued, due to Yandex seeing the launcher is "no longer in demand". The first archive of its support site with the warning banner of discontinuation was on February 10, 2024.

== Technology ==
To generate personal recommendations, Yandex Launcher uses artificial intelligence technology. The system analyzes which of the recommended apps the user has installed or ignored. Based on this information, the system predicts what apps users might be interested in at a later time. The more a user interacts with Launcher, the more accurate the recommendations become. Recommendations also depend on the user's place of residence, their interests and other factors.

Launcher is one of the "Discovery" products of Yandex. Yandex Zen, which is part of Launcher, belongs to the same product category.

Several design elements of Launcher are generated algorithmically. In particular, the color of app information cards are selected automatically based on the color scale of app icons.

The user can select one of the three search engines to use within the Launcher (Yandex, Google or Bing).

== Monetization ==
Monetization of Launcher is due to the built-in recommendation services. Native advertising is displayed inside the Yandex Zen content feed. Most recommendations in the app recommendation service are selected without taking into account the commercial component, but if a user installs one of the commercial recommendations, then the corresponding ad network pays a commissions to Yandex.

According to data from Q2 2016, the experimental business activities of Yandex (which includes Yandex Launcher and Yandex Zen built into it, along with a number of other company products) brought in 153 million rubles in revenue.

== Management ==
The head of the service is Fyodor Yezhov. Prior to this, Yezhov worked at SPB Software and SPB TV.

Earlier, the project was headed by Dmitry Polishchuk.

== Criticism ==
Yandex Launcher has been criticized for the lack of options for fine-tuning the app. In particular, it is not possible to hide icon names. Launcher has also been criticized for the small variety of wallpapers in the online collection.
