= Action Launcher =

Application launcher for Android mobile devices

- Screenshot
- Developer: Chris Lacy
- Release: 2012
- Stable release: 51.0 (November 2024)
- Operating system: Android 5.0 and newer
- Platform: Android
- Type: Application launcher
- License: Proprietary
- Website: https://actionlauncher.com/

Action Launcher is an application launcher mobile app for Android developed by Chris Lacy under the Australian company "Action Launcher Pty. Ltd." (formerly "Digital Ashes"). The program adds a graphical layer on top of the operating system's default application launcher to provide the user with an alternate way of navigating through the operating system, often adding features that the default launcher lacks.

== Timeline of features ==
Action Launcher was first released in 2012.

In 2013, a "1.5" version of the app was released supporting 10-inch tablets and included features that allowed users to quickly access areas of the interface using touch gestures. These features were expanded in the successive "2.0" release.

In 2014, a new version of the launcher was released as "Action Launcher 3", updating "Action Launcher 2". This update added a way to take the main colors of the user's chosen wallpaper and apply them to other elements of the interface, such as widgets. It also restyled the app to follow Material Design guidelines. The app was also split into multiple versions: a free version dubbed "Action Launcher 3", and a paid version called "Action Launcher 2", the latter available via purchase of a separate app called "Action Launcher Pro." Users reported finding this pricing scheme confusing.

In 2016, Quickcuts was released, which allowed users access an app's main functions from the app icon on a home screen.

In 2017, the app was renamed from "Action Launcher 3" to simply "Action Launcher", and integration with Google Feed (formerly Google Now) was added. This required a separate plugin to be sideloaded. The same update added the ability to see unread notifications on app tiles.

In 2019, the launcher added additional support for theming, including dark mode. Another update the same year added support for Android 10's gesture navigation. It also improved upon a feature called ActionDash, an alternative to Google's Digital Wellbeing.

In 2022, v50 was released. This update mirrored some features of Google's Pixel Launcher, with a focus on more support for freemium users. Lacy said of the motivation for the update, "Action Launcher’s freemium implementation has historically been terrible. It was far too aggressive in pushing people to purchase the Plus upgrade, which turned a great many people off, and the app was barely usable for nonpaying customers."

== Reception ==
Action Launcher has been cited by Android media outlets as an alternate launcher available to Android users. As of 2019, it had over 5 million downloads.
