= Aidong Men =

Aidong Men (门爱东; born February 1966) is a professor and doctoral tutor at Beijing University of Posts and Telecommunications (BUPT). He is a director of the Multimedia Telecommunication Laboratory, and a member of the Academic Committee. He is part of multiple committees relating to multimedia.
