= University of Tsukuba =

National university in Tsukuba, Ibaraki, Japan

Coordinates: 36.11143°N 140.10383°E

- 筑波大学
- Motto: Imagine the Future.
- Type: Public (national)
- Established: October 1973 (predecessor founded in 1872)
- President: Kyosuke Nagata
- Faculty: 2,616
- Administrative staff: 2,284
- Students: 16,459
- Undergraduates: 9,798
- Postgraduates: 6,661
- Location: Tsukuba, Ibaraki, Japan
- Campus: Tsukuba (main; Tennōdai, Tsukuba, Ibaraki); Tokyo (Bunkyō, Tokyo); Kuala Lumpur, Malaysia
- Colors: Tsukuba Purple and Tsukuba Blue
- Website: tsukuba.ac.jp

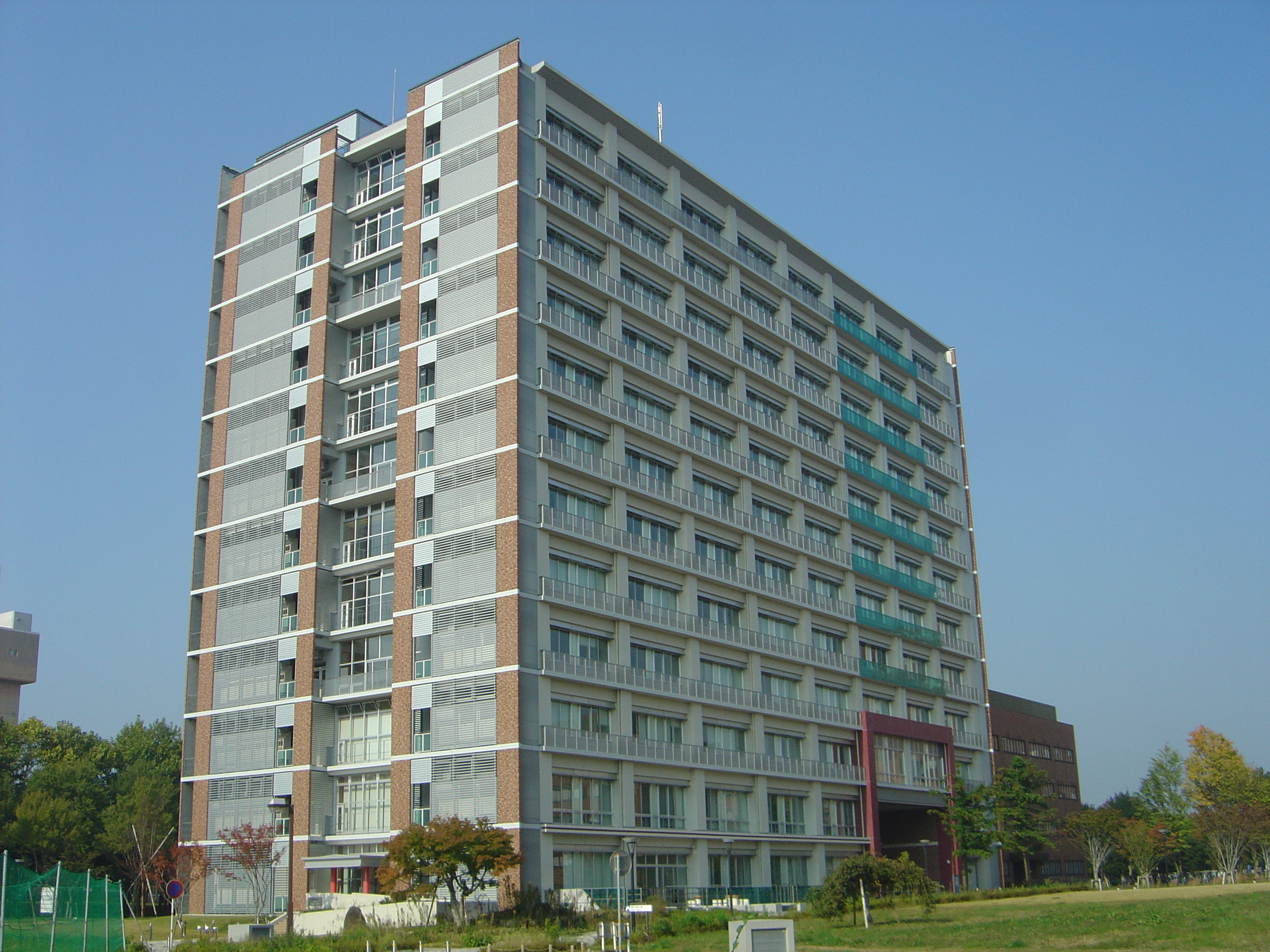
Laboratory of Advanced Research B on the Tsukuba campus

The University of Tsukuba (筑波大学, Tsukuba daigaku) is a national research university in Tsukuba, Ibaraki Prefecture, Japan. Chartered in October 1973 as Japan's first "new concept university" (新構想大学, shinkōsō daigaku) with the Tokyo University of Education as its parent institution, it traces its origins to the first normal school in Japan, established in Tokyo in 1872, which gives it one of the oldest institutional lineages of any Japanese university. It is one of the pre-war government-established (kanritsu) universities and, together with Hiroshima University, one of the two successors of the former "universities of literature and science" (bunrika daigaku).

The university has been selected as a "Top Type" (Type A) institution under the Ministry of Education, Culture, Sports, Science and Technology (MEXT) Super Global University program and was designated a designated national university corporation in 2020.

The university comprises ten undergraduate schools subdivided into colleges, an additional school located overseas, and graduate programs organized under three academic gateways, with around 16,500 students. The main Tsukuba campus covers 258 hectares (636 acres), making it the second-largest single university campus in Japan. A branch campus in Bunkyō, Tokyo, offers evening graduate programs for working adults and administers the university's eleven laboratory (attached) schools in the Greater Tokyo area. In September 2024 the university opened a school on the campus of the University of Malaya in Kuala Lumpur, the first case of a Japanese university establishing a degree-awarding undergraduate school abroad.

Three Nobel Prize laureates have taught at the university or its predecessor: Sin-Itiro Tomonaga, Leo Esaki and Hideki Shirakawa. A fourth laureate, Satoshi Ōmura, studied at the Tokyo University of Education as an auditing student.

== Overview ==
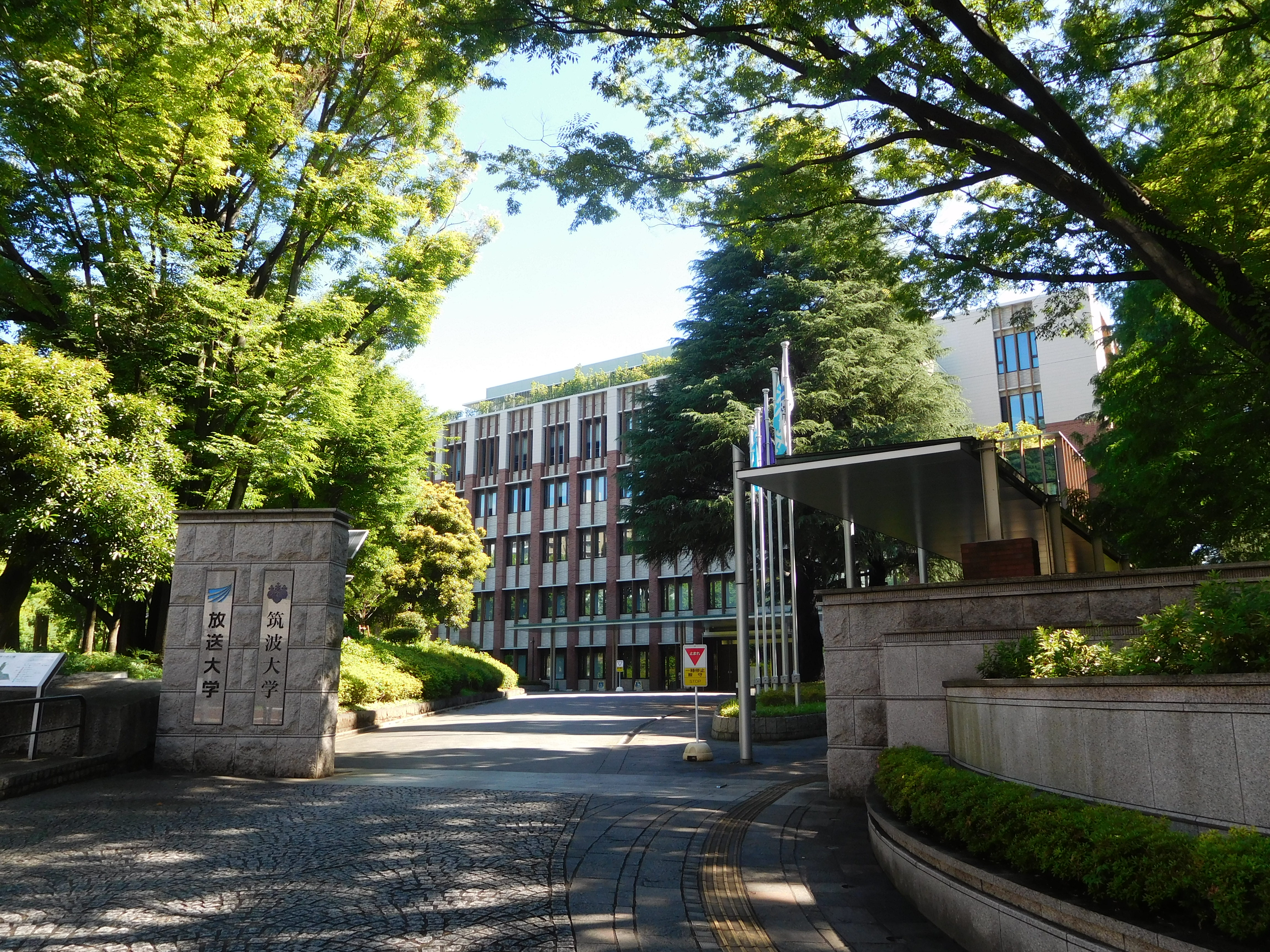
Tokyo Campus Bunkyo School Building (2019)

=== The university as a whole ===
The university's direct forerunner was the Tokyo University of Literature and Science (東京文理科大学, Tōkyō Bunrika Daigaku), later the Tokyo University of Education, whose origin was Japan's first normal school, established in 1872 (Meiji 5). Because that school was founded partly as a successor to the Shōheizaka Gakumonjo (Shōheikō), the former shogunal academy, the university's founding is counted among the oldest lineages of Japanese universities. As the Tokyo University of Education's campuses were cramped and dispersed, relocation to Tsukuba Science City, approved by a cabinet decision of 27 August 1963, began to be debated. Disagreements among the faculty councils and the cancellation of entrance examinations amid the student movement further intensified debate over university reform, and in October 1973 the University of Tsukuba was launched as a "new concept university" with the Tokyo University of Education as its parent body.

Besides the Tsukuba campus, the university also administers part of the grounds of the former Tokyo University of Education. On the former head-office site in Ōtsuka, Bunkyō, Tokyo, the Bunkyo School Building of the Tokyo Campus (formerly the "Ōtsuka district") houses the Education Bureau of the Laboratory Schools, which supervises the attached schools in the Greater Tokyo area; the Graduate School of Business Sciences, an evening graduate school for working adults; the law school; and several research centers.

The National Museum of Nature and Science existed as an attached institution of the Tokyo Higher Normal School from 1889 until it regained independence as the Tokyo Museum of Education in 1914. The Tokyo University of Education was itself formed from four schools — the Tokyo University of Literature and Science, the Tokyo Higher Normal School, the Tokyo College of Agricultural Education and the Tokyo College of Physical Education — and after becoming the University of Tsukuba the institution further merged with the University of Library and Information Science in 2002, so that its history draws on that of many different institutions.

=== Founding principles ===
Under the basic philosophy of an "open university", a "flexible education and research organization" and "new university systems", the university's stated goals are: to pursue internationally outstanding research, both within established disciplines and in fields requiring cooperation across them; to develop autonomous, internationally active graduates through education from the bachelor's to the doctoral level grounded in advanced research; to contribute broadly to society as the core of Tsukuba Science City in cooperation with its research institutions and with industry; to operate as a university open to Asia and the wider world through internationally compatible education, research and exchange; and to lead university reform through collaboration in which faculty and staff each exercise their individuality and diverse abilities.

=== Education and research ===
The university's campuses are broadly divided between the Tsukuba Campus and the Tokyo Campus. At 2,577,286 m^{2}, the Tsukuba Campus is the second-largest single university campus in Japan, after the Ito Campus of Kyushu University and ahead of Hiroshima University's Higashihiroshima Campus (by total landholdings, the largest belong to Hokkaido University, the University of Tokyo and Kyushu University). Nearly all education and research activity is centered there, while the Tokyo Campus is used mainly for graduate programs for working adults.

A defining feature since its founding has been the separation of the university's research and teaching organizations. It has also never had a separate liberal-arts division (kyōyōbu); instead, from the first year students take university-wide general education courses in parallel with specialized courses in their school and college. This "wedge-shaped" curriculum anticipated the 1991 deregulation of Japan's University Establishment Standards.

The medical school was the first in Japan to abolish the traditional division between a two-year premedical course and a four-year specialized course in favor of a six-year integrated medical curriculum, a model subsequently followed by newly established medical universities.

The graduate level consists of three academic gateways (gakujutsuin), and the undergraduate level of ten schools. The university also operates several nationwide joint-use research facilities and campus-wide education and research centers.

In the Times Higher Education World University Rankings 2019–2020, the university was placed 401st–450th in the world, 55th in Asia and 8th in Japan.

On 24 January 2019, the university announced a basic policy of not conducting research intended for military use; research funded by domestic or foreign military or defense organizations, or whose results could potentially be diverted to military use, is subject to prior internal review.

=== Academic culture ===
The university is active in industry–academia collaboration: it had produced 61 spin-off venture companies as of the end of FY2006 (third among Japanese universities), with 8 new university-launched ventures in FY2006 alone (first in Japan).

Since November 2008 the Tsukuba Action Project (T-ACT), adopted under a MEXT student-support "Good Practice" grant, has supported students' independent activities by building a mutual support network among the university, faculty members and students and providing start-up assistance.

== History ==
=== Outline ===
The university was established on the basis of the Tsukuba Research and Academic City Construction Act of 1970 and the National School Establishment Act as amended in 1973 (Act No. 103 of 29 September 1973). Because the university had a distinctive structure without conventional faculties, the amended act contained a chapter, "Chapter 2-2: Organization of the University of Tsukuba", devoted specifically to it.

A national campaign for democratic education comprising sixteen organizations — including the Sōhyō and Chūritsu Rōren labor federations, the Japan Teachers' Union, the Japan Scientists' Association and the Japan Association for the Protection of Children — mounted strong opposition to the 1973 bill and demanded its withdrawal.

The Tokyo University of Education, the university's predecessor, was closed at the end of March 1978. In 2002, under an amendment to the National School Establishment Act (Act No. 23 of 2002), the university merged with the University of Library and Information Science.

=== Timeline ===
- October 1970: University of Tsukuba construction office opened.
- 1 October 1973: University of Tsukuba opened, with the First Cluster of Colleges (Humanities, Social Sciences, Natural Sciences), the Medical Specialist Cluster, the College of Physical Education and the university library.
- 1975: Second Cluster of Colleges (Comparative Culture, Human Sciences, Biological Sciences, Agriculture and Forestry), College of Art and Design, and a master's program in area studies established.
- 1976: University of Tsukuba Hospital opened.
- 1977: Third Cluster of Colleges established (Socio-Engineering, Information Sciences, Basic Engineering).
- 1978: Tokyo University of Education closed; doctoral program in socio-engineering and Junior College of Medical Technology established.
- 1980–1981: Doctoral programs in medicine (1980) and engineering (1981) established.
- 1983: College of International Relations established (Third Cluster).
- 1985: College of Japanese Language and Culture established (Second Cluster).
- 1 April 1989: Graduate School of Systems Management (GSSM), an evening MBA program for working adults, established at the Ōtsuka campus.
- 1990: Evening graduate program in corporate law added at Ōtsuka.
- 1991: College of Engineering Systems established.
- 1994: College of Agriculture and Forestry renamed College of Agro-Biological Resources.
- 1995: College of International Relations reorganized as the College of International Studies.
- 1996: Doctoral program in corporate sciences added at Ōtsuka.
- 1998: College of Basic Engineering reorganized; working-adult graduate programs at Ōtsuka reorganized into the independent Graduate School of Business Sciences.
- 1 October 2002: Merger with the University of Library and Information Science; Kasuga campus, College of Library and Information Science and Graduate School of Library, Information and Media Studies established. The Medical Specialist Cluster was reorganized into the College of Medicine and the College of Nursing and Medical Sciences, and the junior college ceased recruiting.
- March–April 2004: University of Library and Information Science formally closed; National University Corporation University of Tsukuba inaugurated (1 April).
- 2005: Akihabara district of the Tokyo Campus established; professional graduate programs opened (law school and the MBA Program in International Business); the Ōtsuka campus renamed the Ōtsuka district of the Tokyo Campus; a discounted circulating campus bus service operated by Kanto Railway introduced.
- March 2006: Junior College of Medical Technology abolished.
- April 2007: Undergraduate organization reorganized from 7 clusters (including 4 specialist clusters) and 15 colleges into 9 schools (including 2 specialist schools) and 23 colleges.
- 10 December 2010: Statue of Kanō Jigorō (by Fumio Asakura) unveiled in front of the University Hall.
- 11 March 2011: Damaged in the Great East Japan Earthquake; damage totaled some 7 billion yen. On 30 September, the Bunkyo School Building of the Tokyo Campus opened following redevelopment of the former Ōtsuka district.
- April 2017: Mountain Science Center established, integrating the Sugadaira Montane Research Center with the university forests.
- October 2019: Data science made a required subject for all undergraduates entering from 2019.
- 1 April 2020: Graduate education moved to a degree-program system (3 academic gateways, 6 research groups); pre-existing graduate schools remain for continuing students. On 15 October, designated a designated national university corporation.
- April 2021: First intake of the School of Comprehensive Studies, established the previous year.
- April 2024: Partnership with the University of Washington in the field of artificial intelligence signed (9 April). In September, an overseas school (School of Transdisciplinary Science and Design) opened within the University of Malaya in Kuala Lumpur, Malaysia — the first undergraduate school established abroad by a Japanese university to award Japanese degrees.

== Symbols ==
=== Visual identity and school colors ===
The university maintains a visual identification (VI) system regulating its emblem, logotype, base colors and their usage. Purple is the symbolic color of the university; the exact shades were fixed in 1999 as the base color "Tsukuba Purple" (HTML #6600CC) and the secondary "Tsukuba Blue" (HTML #33FFFF). Since 2012, the uniforms of the university's athletic association teams have been unified in a pale blue known as "FUTURE BLUE".

=== Emblem ===
The university emblem is the "five-three paulownia leaf". It originates in the Tokyo Higher Normal School student badge as revised in 1903 and was carried over into the Tokyo University of Education student badge produced in 1949. In 1974 the University Council resolved to continue the paulownia-leaf design in succession to the Tokyo University of Education tradition, and it became the emblem of the University of Tsukuba. The paulownia crest is, alongside the chrysanthemum, a traditional emblem of Japan, but the university's version is distinctive in rendering the flowers in silhouette (kage) form.

=== Slogan ===
Since FY2010 the university has used the slogan "IMAGINE THE FUTURE.", symbolizing its founding ideals; it appears on university materials and banners across campus. It was devised by the alumnus copywriter Hiroshi Ichikura.

=== Songs ===
The student handbook prints the lyrics of the student songs "Hitachino no" (常陸野の) and "Tsukuba no Gama" (筑波のガマ), which function in practice as school songs. "Hitachino no", written in January 1975 shortly after the university's founding (lyrics by Katsuhiko Aoki, music by Mutsuko Iijima), is said to depict the rebirth of the Tokyo University of Education as the University of Tsukuba and is sung at entrance and graduation ceremonies. Among athletic association students, the older cheer song "Kiri no Ha" (桐の葉, "Paulownia Leaves") is better known: it was written in 1919, during the Tokyo Higher Normal School's campaign for elevation to university status, with its first two verses by the then-student Sukeo Yamato and a third verse later added by Nobuo Ōyama, the last president of the Tokyo University of Education, set to the melody of a Keio University cheer song. Following the adoption of the slogan, a message song, "IMAGINE THE FUTURE 〜Mirai o Omoe", was composed by the alumnus Yoichiro Yoshikawa with lyrics by Ichikura, and is frequently performed at official ceremonies. The former Tokyo University of Education school song, "Seiun no sora ni takaku", has lyrics by Kitahara Hakushū and music by Kosaku Yamada.

== Organization ==
=== Schools and colleges ===
The basic teaching organizations to which undergraduate students belong are schools (学群, gakugun), subdivided into colleges (学類, gakurui). Unlike the faculties and departments of most Japanese universities, in which academic staff and graduate students are also enrolled, Tsukuba's schools and colleges are purely educational organizations, separate from the research organization to which faculty members belong (originally the gakkei, now the kei system); a similar separation has been adopted at Fukushima University and J. F. Oberlin University.

The original organization into numbered "clusters of colleges" reflected the university's founding emphasis on interdisciplinarity and the integration of the humanities and sciences, but was long regarded as difficult for applicants and the public to understand. Following the graduate school reorganizations of 2000–2001, a reorganization of the schools and colleges was formally announced on 21 July 2005 and took effect for students entering in April 2007: the numbered cluster system was abolished in favor of discipline-based schools, and the structure changed from 7 clusters (including 4 specialist clusters) with 15 colleges to 9 schools (including 2 specialist schools) with 23 colleges, with no change in total enrollment capacity.

The School of Comprehensive Studies (総合学域群, Sōgō Gakuiki-gun), which belongs to none of the existing schools, was established in 2020 with a first intake in April 2021. It enrolls only first-year students admitted through a "comprehensive selection" examination (in four tracks: humanities and social sciences, and sciences I–III); students take courses offered across the schools while deciding on a destination school, to which they transfer from the second year (except the School of Health and Physical Education), subject to prerequisite courses and capacity limits.

The current schools and their colleges are:

- School of Comprehensive Studies (first-year students only; established 2020)
- School of Humanities and Culture: College of Humanities; College of Comparative Culture; College of Japanese Language and Culture
- School of Social and International Studies: College of Social Sciences; College of International Studies
- School of Human Sciences: College of Education; College of Psychology; College of Disability Sciences
- School of Life and Environmental Sciences: College of Biological Sciences; College of Agro-Biological Resource Sciences; College of Geoscience
- School of Science and Engineering: College of Mathematics; College of Physics; College of Chemistry; College of Engineering Sciences; College of Engineering Systems; College of Policy and Planning Sciences
- School of Informatics: College of Information Science; College of Media Arts, Science and Technology; College of Knowledge and Library Sciences
- School of Medicine and Medical Sciences: College of Medicine (six-year program, including a "New Medical Course" research-physician track); College of Nursing; College of Medical Sciences
- School of Health and Physical Education
- School of Art and Design
- School of Transdisciplinary Science and Design (Kuala Lumpur, Malaysia; established 2024)

Under the Global 30 internationalization project, English-medium undergraduate programs are offered in social and international studies, interdisciplinary life and environmental sciences, and international medical sciences.

=== Graduate schools ===
In April 2020 the university moved its entire graduate education to a degree-program system, organized under three academic gateways (学術院, gakujutsuin) containing six research groups, with the stated eventual aim of a single unified graduate school. Professional graduate programs (including the law school) sit within the gateways but outside the research groups. The structure is:

- Graduate School of Business Sciences, Humanities and Social Sciences (人文社会ビジネス科学学術院): Research Group in Humanities and Social Sciences (3 degree programs); Research Group in Business Sciences (2 degree programs); professional degree programs in law (law school) and international business (MBA-IB).
- Graduate School of Science and Technology (理工情報生命学術院): Research Group in Pure and Applied Sciences (5 degree programs); Research Group in Systems and Information Engineering (8 degree programs); Research Group in Life and Earth Sciences (12 degree programs); international joint degree program in Sustainable Environmental Science.
- Graduate School of Comprehensive Human Sciences (人間総合科学学術院): Research Group in Comprehensive Human Sciences (26 degree programs); joint degree programs in International Development and Peace through Sport and in Advanced Physical Education and Sports for Higher Education; international joint degree program in Agro-Food Health Sciences.

The previous structure of eight graduate schools and 85 programs continues in parallel for students who enrolled through the 2019 academic year.

==== Graduate programs for working adults ====
The university's evening graduate programs for working adults are concentrated at the Bunkyo School Building of the Tokyo Campus. The Graduate School of Systems Management (GSSM), established in 1989, was the pioneer of working-adult MBA education at Japanese national universities; a corporate-law program followed in 1990, a doctoral program in 1996, and in 1998 these were reorganized into the independent Graduate School of Business Sciences. The professional law school and the MBA Program in International Business were added in 2005. In a 2012 survey by Nikkei and Nikkei HR, the systems management program ranked tenth among MBA programs in eastern Japan that respondents wished to attend, and it has been noted for its theory-oriented curriculum, close contact between students and faculty, and moderate fees. The Graduate School of Comprehensive Human Sciences also offers evening programs at the Tokyo Campus in counseling, rehabilitation, lifespan development sciences and sports and health systems management.

=== School of Integrative and Global Majors ===
The School of Integrative and Global Majors (SIGMA), established in December 2011, operates transdisciplinary degree programs spanning the university. Its five-year integrated PhD Program in Human Biology was adopted under MEXT's Program for Leading Graduate Schools in 2011, with faculty drawn from the medical, life and environmental, systems and information, and pure and applied sciences, together with instructors from industry and overseas universities; entrance examinations have also been held in Bonn, Beijing, Tashkent, Ho Chi Minh City, Dallas and Tunis. The PhD Program in Empowerment Informatics was adopted under the same MEXT program in 2013, with its first students admitted in April 2014.

=== Faculty organization ===
A faculty organization of "faculties" (系, kei) was introduced in October 2011, and each faculty member in principle belongs to one of them; the earlier gakkei research organization, which had lost its substantive role as faculty members came to belong to the graduate schools, was abolished in March 2012. The faculties are: Humanities and Social Sciences; Business Sciences; Pure and Applied Sciences (domains of mathematics, physics, chemistry, applied physics and materials science); Engineering, Information and Systems (policy and planning sciences, computer science, intelligent and mechanical interaction systems, engineering mechanics and energy); Life and Environmental Sciences; Human Sciences (education, psychology, disability sciences); Health and Sport Sciences; Art and Design; Medicine (biomedical sciences, clinical medicine, health sciences); and Library, Information and Media Science.

== Research ==
=== Competitive funding programs ===
Four projects were adopted under the 21st Century Center of Excellence Program: in 2002, "Analysis of complex biological-system response mechanisms and their advanced agricultural application" (life sciences), "Promotion of interdisciplinary materials science for the creation of future functions" (chemistry and materials science) and "Promotion of health and sport sciences research" (interdisciplinary fields); and in 2003, "Promotion of kansei (affective) science elucidating the mind" (interdisciplinary fields). Under the successor Global Centers of Excellence Program, the project "Cybernics: fusion of human, machine and information systems" (information, electrical and electronic engineering) was adopted in 2007.

The Department of Computer Science was selected in September 2006 for MEXT's program for cultivating leading IT specialists, and in April 2006 the Graduate School of Systems and Information Engineering was designated a key cooperation base for the development of advanced ICT human resources by the Japan Business Federation (Keidanren). Ahead of the Tokyo 2020 Olympic and Paralympic Games, the university was selected as a Type A contractor for MEXT's Sports Academy Formation Support Project, cooperating with the National Institute of Fitness and Sports in Kanoya and Nippon Sport Science University to build networks with physical education and sport universities worldwide.

Internationally, the university co-proposed a human-resources development research project of the Asia-Pacific Economic Cooperation (APEC) with Khon Kaen University in Thailand, promoting research on mathematics, science and information education across the APEC region, and as the only affiliate member institution of the Southeast Asian Ministers of Education Organization (SEAMEO) in Japan it conducts joint education-reform projects with the SEAMEO secretariat and its 27 regional centers, including annual meetings, international collaborative practicums and online courses.

Its Graduate School of Life and Environmental Sciences is represented on the national Coordinating Committee for Earthquake Prediction.

== Affiliated institutions ==
=== University hospital ===
The University of Tsukuba Hospital, on the Tsukuba campus, opened in 1976.

=== University libraries ===
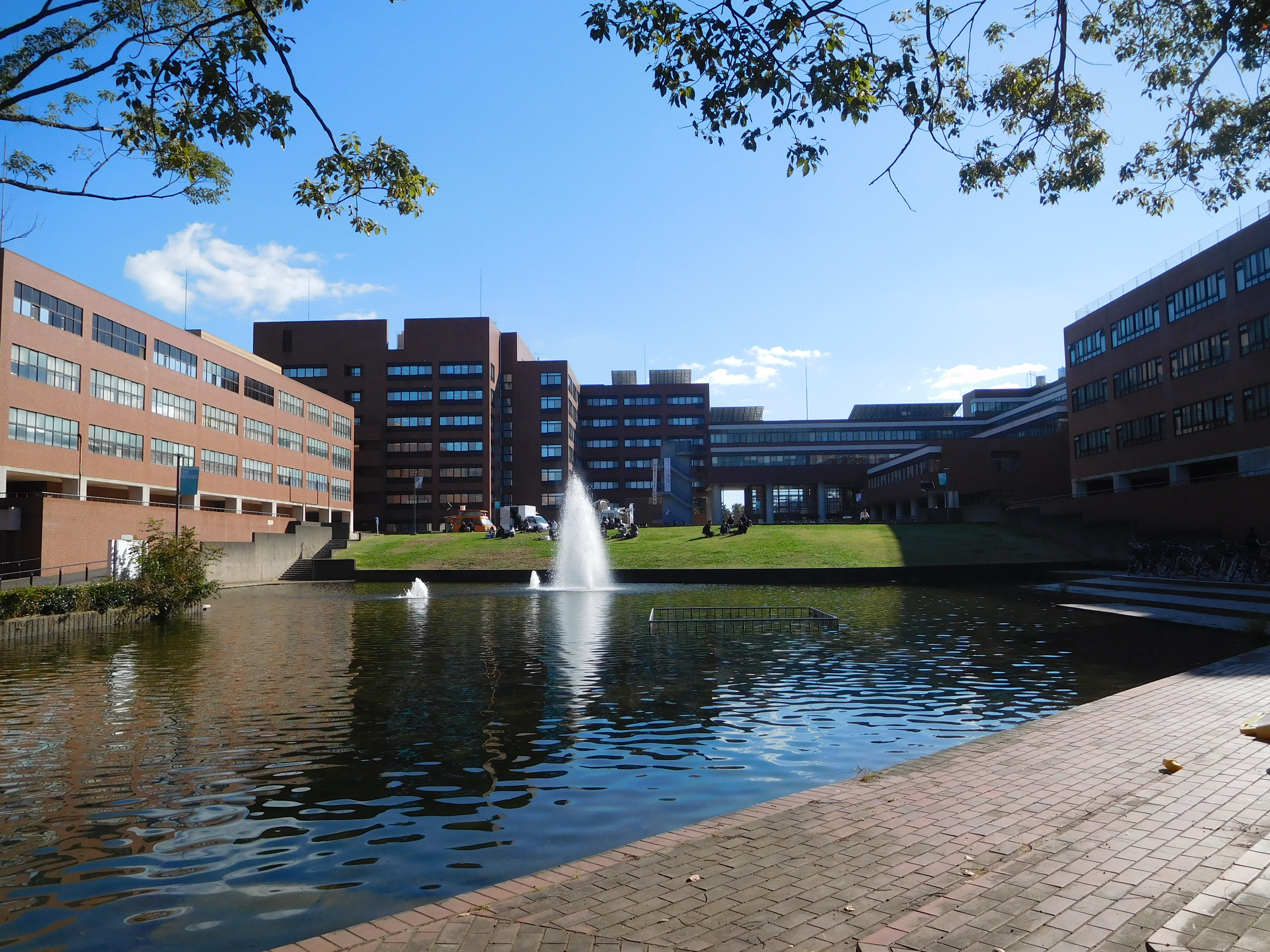
The Central Library seen from the Third Area

The libraries on the Tsukuba campus comprise the Central Library, the Art and Physical Education Library, the Medical Library and the Library on Library and Information Science, with the Otsuka Library at the Tokyo Campus. Unusually for a Japanese university library system, the collections are almost entirely open-stack, allowing users to browse freely except for rare materials; all libraries are open to all students and staff, and to external users upon registration. Total visits exceed one million per year. The Central Library holds about 1.76 million volumes across all fields, while the three specialized libraries hold around 200,000 volumes each.

=== Laboratory schools ===
The university has eleven attached ("laboratory") schools, supervised by the Education Bureau of the Laboratory Schools. When the Tokyo University of Education closed, only the university itself relocated to Tsukuba, and the attached schools remained at their original sites in the Tokyo area:

- Elementary School (Bunkyō, Tokyo)
- Junior High School and Senior High School at Otsuka (Bunkyō, Tokyo)
- Junior and Senior High School at Komaba (Setagaya, Tokyo)
- Senior High School at Sakado (Sakado, Saitama)
- Special Needs Education School for the Visually Impaired (Bunkyō, Tokyo)
- Special Needs Education School for the Deaf (Ichikawa, Chiba)
- Special Needs Education School for the Mentally Challenged at Otsuka (Bunkyō, Tokyo)
- Special Needs Education School for the Physically Challenged at Kirigaoka (Itabashi, Tokyo)
- Special Needs Education School for Children with Autism at Kurihama (Yokosuka, Kanagawa)

The alumni association Meikeikai separately operates Meikei Gakuen Junior and Senior High School in Tsukuba, founded as a centennial project of the association and in part because the attached schools themselves could not relocate to Tsukuba Science City.

=== Research centers ===
Nationwide joint-use facilities include the Center for Computational Sciences, the Plasma Research Center, the Shimoda Marine Research Center and the Gene Research Center. Campus-wide education and research centers include the Life Science Center for Survival Dynamics (Tsukuba Advanced Research Alliance, TARA), the Foreign Language Center, the Sport and Physical Education Center, the International Student Center, the Admission Center, the Alliance for Research on North Africa, the Academic Computing and Communications Center, the Research Facility Center for Science and Technology, the Center for Cybernics Research, the Center for Research in Radioisotope and Environmental Dynamics, and the University Health Center. Centers attached to individual faculties include the Research Center for University Studies; the Tsukuba Research Center for Interdisciplinary Materials Science; the Tsukuba-Plant Innovation Research Center (T-PIRC, formed in 2017 by merging the Agricultural and Forestry Research Center with the Gene Research Center's farm functions); the Mountain Science Center; the Center for Research on International Cooperation in Educational Development; the Laboratory Animal Resource Center; the Tsukuba Clinical Research and Development Organization (CREIL); the Research Center for Knowledge Communities; the Proton Medical Research Center; and the Special Needs Education Research Center. Other facilities include the International Institute for Integrative Sleep Medicine (WPI-IIIS), the national teacher-training facility for physical therapy education of the visually impaired, a venture business laboratory, the technology licensing organization Tsukuba Liaison Laboratory, the joint meteorological observation station at the summit of Mount Tsukuba (operated with Tsukubasan Shrine), and an overseas office in Bonn.

== Campus and facilities ==
=== Tsukuba Campus ===
The Tsukuba Campus is the university's main campus. Because of its vast area, the university operates a campus transportation system unusual among Japanese universities: holders of an annual pass may ride the buses circulating through the campus without limit.

=== Tokyo Campus ===
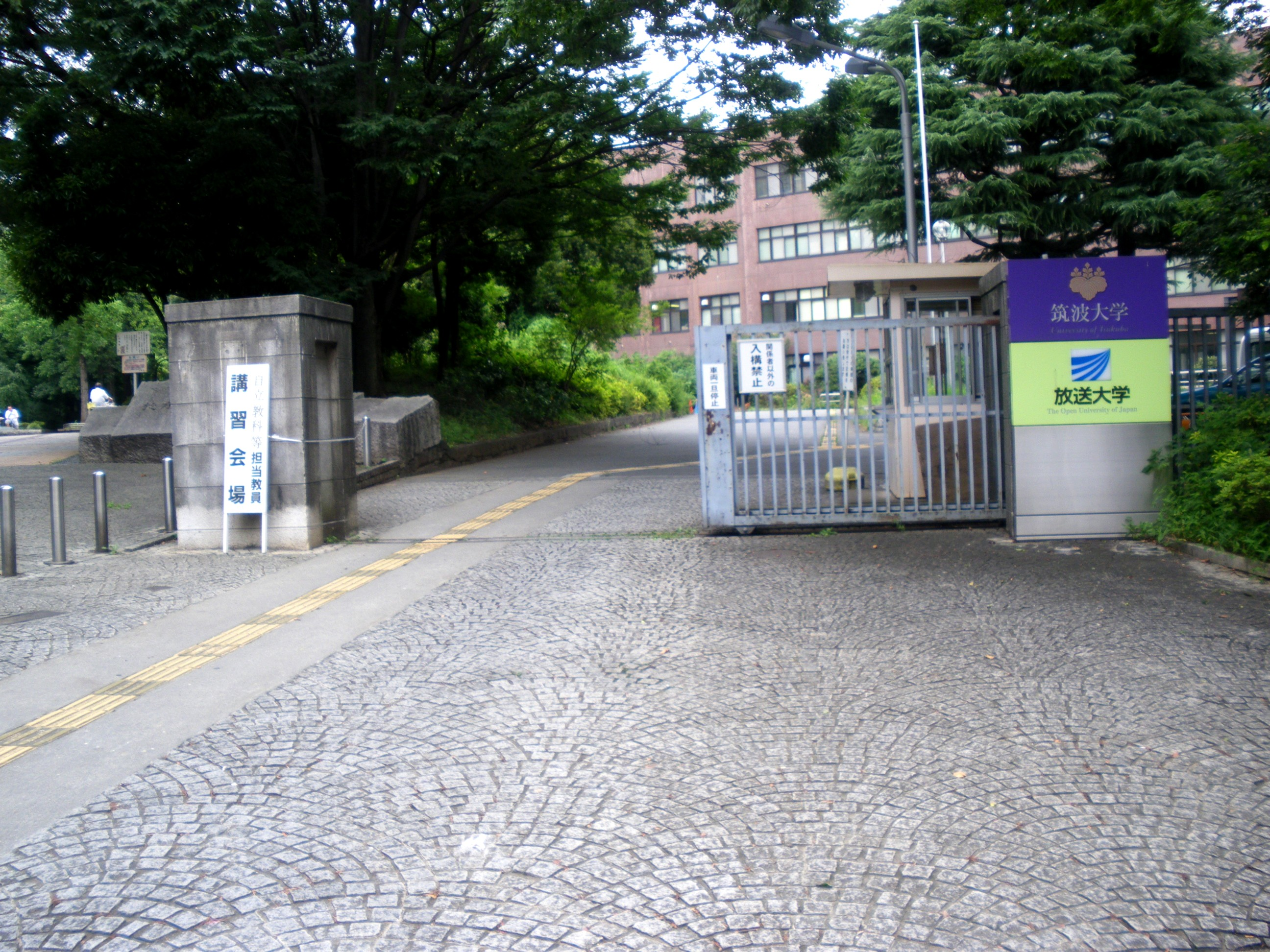
The Ōtsuka district of the Tokyo Campus (2009), prior to redevelopment

The Bunkyo School Building of the Tokyo Campus, formerly known as the Ōtsuka campus (and later the Ōtsuka district), stands on part of the former Tokyo University of Education site; other parts of the site became the Bunkyō ward's Park of the Forest of Education, while the attached Elementary School remains adjacent. A new building jointly constructed with the Open University of Japan (one basement and six above-ground floors) opened in September 2011 and is positioned as a hub for lifelong learning; the Open University bore roughly a quarter of the construction cost and operates its Tokyo Bunkyo Study Center primarily on the second floor. The building is two minutes on foot from Myōgadani Station on the Tokyo Metro Marunouchi Line. It houses the evening working-adult graduate programs, including the Graduate School of Business Sciences and law school, some programs of the Graduate School of Comprehensive Human Sciences and other units, the Otsuka Library, and the Education Bureau of the Laboratory Schools, serving as the university's satellite campus in Tokyo. An Akihabara district (on the 14th–15th floors of the Akihabara Daibiru building), opened in 2005 to coincide with the opening of the Tsukuba Express line, was closed following completion of the Bunkyo School Building.

=== Student housing ===
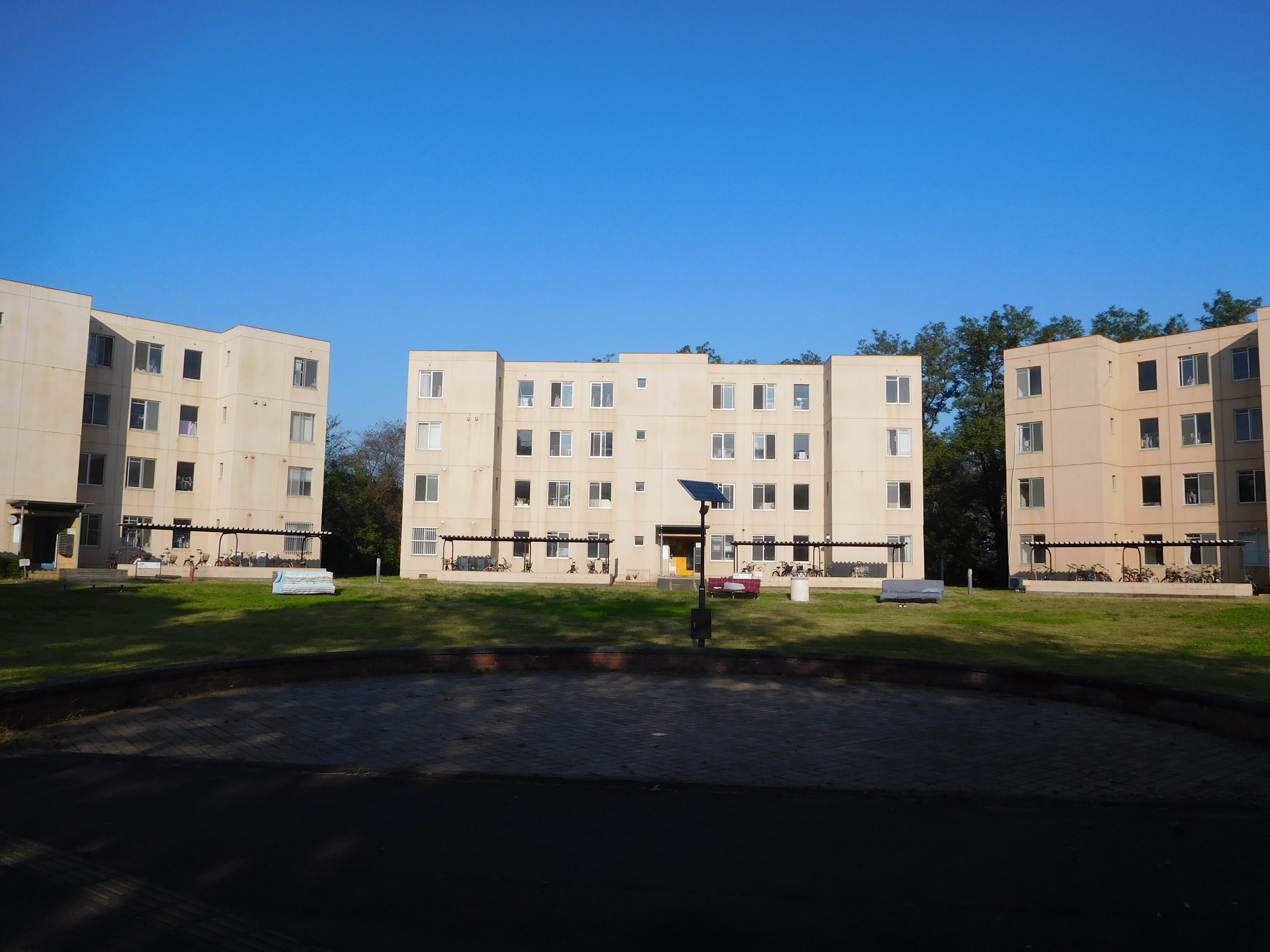
Oikoshi student residences

The university operates five student housing complexes, all on the Tsukuba campus, with a total capacity of about 4,000: Ichinoya, Hirasuna, Oikoshi, the Global Village and Kasuga (the former University of Library and Information Science dormitory). Because little private student housing was expected to be available at the university's opening, the residences were planned to accommodate about 60% of the student body, later revised downward to the 40% range as private housing developed nearby. Initially nearly all first- and second-year students lived in the residences; later they came to house mainly first-year students. In 2017 the Global Village, a share-house style residence built under a private finance initiative, opened in the southeastern part of the Hirasuna area.

=== Dining and shops ===
The university has no officially recognized university co-op; all shops and dining facilities on campus are operated by private businesses contracted through the University of Tsukuba Kōseikai (welfare association). The Tsukuba campus has about twenty dining facilities in the lecture buildings, residence commons and headquarters building, including cafeterias, coffee shops, a soba restaurant and a soup restaurant; the former Third Area shopping arcade was renovated as a food court in December 2007, and a Starbucks opened inside the Central Library in March 2008. There are also six bookstores, bank and postal ATMs, a post office, an art supply store, convenience stores, a travel agency, a university goods shop and a childcare facility for staff.

== Student life ==
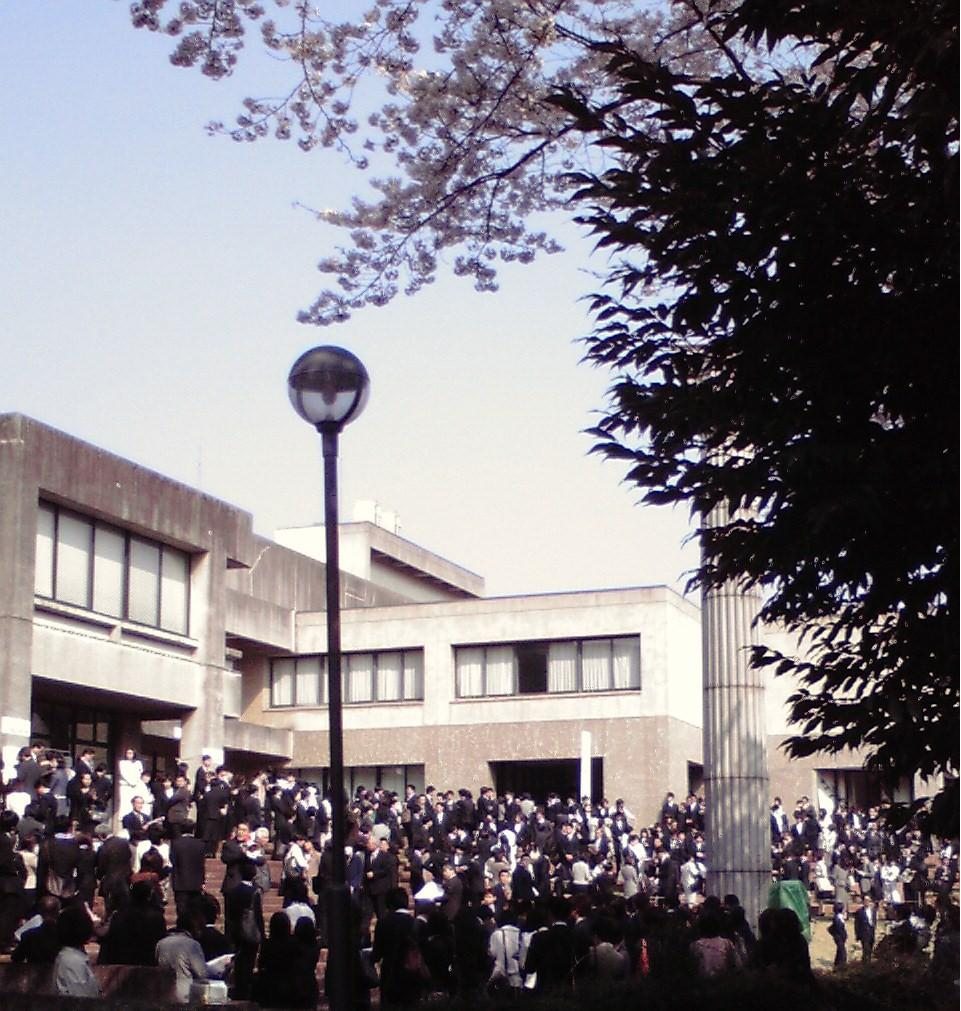
Students gathering for the 2009 entrance ceremony

=== Student representation ===
In place of a conventional student self-government association, the university officially recognizes two student bodies — the All-University Representative Council of Colleges, Specialist Schools and the School of Comprehensive Studies (Zendaikai) at the university level, and the Class Representative Councils (Kuradaikai) at the school and college level — which negotiate with the university administration on matters of student life.

=== Circles ===
Student circles are registered in three tiers: officially recognized extracurricular organizations, registered general student organizations, and unregistered "grass" circles. Recognized organizations must have a faculty advisor and belong to one of three federations — the Cultural Circles Federation, the Athletic Association or the Arts Circles Federation — after screening, in exchange for activity subsidies from the Shihōkai student support organization, university-provided equipment and space, and priority facility booking. After the entrance ceremony each April, a welcome festival for recruiting new students to circles is held in the First Area. Notable circles have included the a cappella circle Doo-wop, from which Masayoshi Okumura of RAG FAIR emerged; the Tsugaru shamisen club Mugenjuku, which has produced professional players and was the only student circle to perform at Expo 2005; the campus broadcasting society THK, a strong performer in the NHK national university broadcasting contest; the double dutch circle Purplume; and the unofficial esports circle Tsuquid.

=== Festivals ===
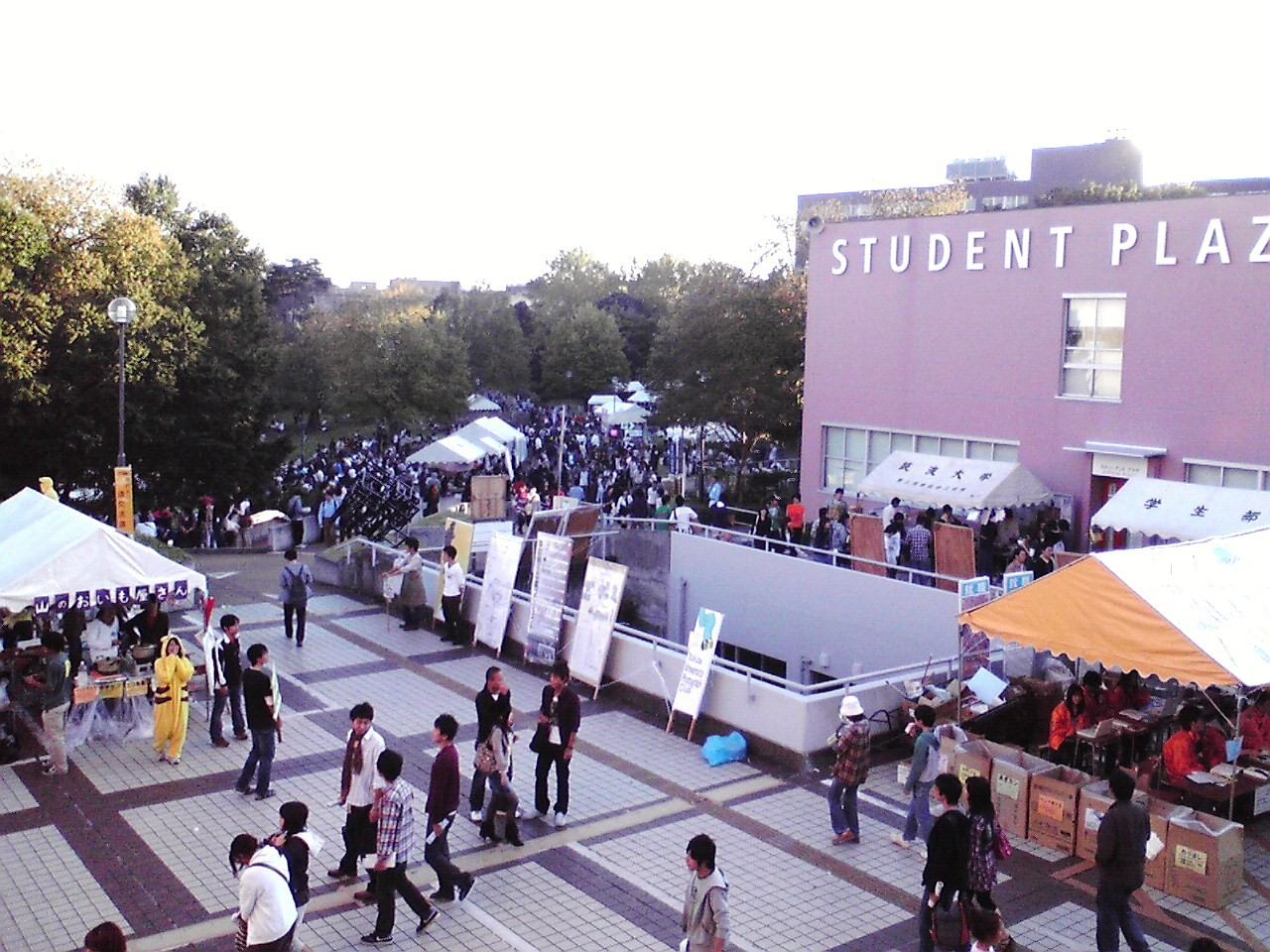
Sōhōsai school festival (October 2009, First Area)

The university festival, the Sōhōsai (雙峰祭, "Twin Peaks Festival"), is held each November over a Friday to Sunday across the area from the physical education and arts buildings to the Second and Third Areas. It is known for its exceptionally large number of food stalls, and since 2001 has also featured exhibits presenting the university's research, of which a demonstration of MRI-based osteoporosis diagnosis proved especially popular. The festival is run by an executive committee under the Zendaikai; after clashes between students and the administration, the university cancelled the festival twice, in 1980 and 1984.

A separate dormitory festival, the Yadokari-sai (やどかり祭, "Hermit Crab Festival"), is held on a Friday and Saturday in late May in the Hirasuna residence area, where most first-year residents run stalls by class; traditional events include a yukata contest performance competition and a parade of portable shrines built by each school. It is run by an independent executive committee.

College-level traditions include the Program Bug Memorial Service (bagu ireisai) of the College of Information Science, held to console the spirits of the software bugs its students have created and destroyed, and the Natural Sciences General Project committee (SP), an inter-college exchange body of the mathematics, physics, chemistry and geoscience colleges that regularly exhibits at the festival.

=== Student publications ===
Two college journals are currently published, both in the School of Informatics: WORD of the College of Information Science, founded on 26 January 1979 and named for the unit of information rather than Microsoft Word, and MILK ("Management Information Library Knowledge") of the College of Knowledge and Library Sciences, founded in September 2011. MAST ("Media Arts, Science and Technology") of the College of Media Arts, Science and Technology, founded in 2009 and online-only from December 2015, has been on hiatus since 2020.

=== Sports ===
The university is not a member of the Japan Association for University Athletics and Sport (UNIVAS). Its teams have a strong record among national universities:

- The association football club has won the All Japan University Football Championship four times as the University of Tsukuba (eight including the Tokyo University of Education era) and the Prime Minister's Cup three times, and has sent many players to the J.League.
- The baseball club, a member of the Metropolitan Area University Baseball League, won the autumn Meiji Jingu Tournament in 1987, the only national university to have done so.
- The rugby club plays in the Kanto University Rugby Taikōsen group and won its first Group A title in 2012.
- The men's basketball club is the only team to have appeared in every edition of the All-Japan University Basketball Championship (including the Tokyo University of Education era) and has won it three times, uniquely among national universities; the women's team has ten titles, including four consecutive championships completed in 1984. The men's team plays an annual spring fixture, the Nittsuku-sen, against Nippon Sport Science University.
- The track and field club has appeared 62 times in the Hakone Ekiden — eighth all-time and the most of any national university — and five times in the All Japan University Ekiden; the women's team has 21 appearances in the All Japan University Women's Ekiden, with three championships.
- The men's volleyball club holds thirteen national titles (nine intercollegiate championships and four East–West intercollegiate titles), tied for second all-time, and the women's club six intercollegiate titles.
- The judo club left the All-Japan Student Judo Federation in 1983 to become a founding member of a rival university judo federation under the All Japan Judo Federation (the two merged in 1988). Its members have included three All-Japan women's champions (Midori Shintani, Mika Sugimoto and Akari Ogata) and numerous Olympic and world medalists, including the two-time Olympic champion Ayumi Tanimoto.

== External relations ==
=== Partnerships and international engagement ===
Within Japan, the university forms an industry–academia collaboration platform with several universities and research institutions. As of July 2025, it has 384 agreements with universities and research institutions in 68 countries and regions, and thirteen overseas offices in twelve countries, including Brazil, China, Germany, France, Indonesia, Kazakhstan, Malaysia, Tunisia, Taiwan, the United States, Uzbekistan and Vietnam.

The university has repeatedly won government internationalization funding, including MEXT's Global 30 project and the Super Global University project, in which it received Type A funding intended for universities aiming at the world's top 100; its initiatives include expanding English-medium courses and degree programs, faculty sharing with partner institutions such as National Taiwan University, the University of Bordeaux and the University of California, Irvine, and a "Course Jukebox" system allowing students to earn credit for partner-institution courses. In 2004 it established the Alliance for Research on North Africa (ARENA) and in 2006 opened a branch office in Tunis; it accepts African graduate students under the ABE Initiative and leads the Japan-Africa Academic Network (JAAN). During the 2008 Tokyo International Conference on African Development, the university signed a memorandum of understanding with the African Development Bank on cooperation in higher education, science and technology. It participates in the ASEAN-region AIMS student mobility program, and in March 2023 announced the establishment of its Malaysia campus, becoming the first Japanese public university to set up a campus outside Japan.

=== Community engagement ===
The International Industry-University Collaboration Headquarters manages contracted and joint research with companies, intellectual property activities and support for university start-ups. In local revitalization work in the Hōjō district of Tsukuba, university students developed "Hōjō Rice Scream", an ice cream using locally grown Hōjō rice. In 2023, as part of the university's 50th (and founding 151st) anniversary programs and using the T-ACT framework, it hosted the "Japan-Korea Mirai Factory Award 2023", a large-scale youth exchange program held in both countries.

== Reputation and rankings ==
University rankings
Global
THE	General	351–400
QS	General	350=
ARWU	Research	201–300

Regional
THE Asia (Asia version)	General	87
QS Asia (Asia version)	General	63

National

Program rankings

In a 2021 survey of corporate hiring managers conducted by Nihon Keizai Shimbun and Nikkei HR, covering personnel officers at 4,850 listed and major unlisted companies, the university ranked 16th nationally among 788 universities.

=== Research performance ===
Tsukuba is ranked among the highest research institutions in Japan. According to Thomson Reuters, Tsukuba is the 10th best research institution among all universities and non-educational research institutions in Japan. The Weekly Diamond reported that Tsukuba had the 27th highest research standard in Japan in research funding per researcher in the COE Program, and ranked 11th in "Good Practice" funds per student. In January 2011, Research Papers in Economics ranked Tsukuba as the eighth highest economics research university in Japan.

=== Graduate school rankings ===
Tsukuba's law school was ranked 19th in 2010 for its passing rate on the Japanese bar examination. Eduniversal ranked Tsukuba seventh among "Excellent Business Schools nationally strong and/or with continental links" in Japan.

=== Alumni rankings ===
According to the Weekly Economist's 2010 rankings, graduates from Tsukuba had the 64th best employment rate at 400 major companies in Japan, and according to PRESIDENT Inc., graduates of Tsukuba had the 8th highest average salary in Japan.

=== Popularity and selectivity ===
Selectivity rankings for undergraduate programs at the University of Tsukuba are typically placed within the top 20 in Japan by domestic preparatory schools.

== Controversies ==
The university has been subject to public disputes and criticism. According to Debito Arudou, the university's management of foreign staff members led to litigation: in 1985 the university decided to terminate the contracts of foreign teaching staff, resulting in litigation against the institution. Ivan Hall criticized the university's treatment of foreign staff and handling of contractual obligations in Cartels of the Mind.

On 12 July 1991, the university became the site of a murder when Hitoshi Igarashi, the Japanese translator of Salman Rushdie's The Satanic Verses, was killed in the context of the fatwa initiated by Ayatollah Ruhollah Khomeini following the book's publication. The case was closed in 2006 with no suspects brought to trial.

In January 2020, the Mainichi Shimbun reported that since 2018 the aptitude test used in the entrance examination of the College of Medicine had asked applicants to state their height and weight, drawing criticism on human-rights grounds; the university said it would consider whether to revise the practice.

Between 2019 and 2021, a number of controversies revolving around the university's president Kyosuke Nagata came to light. Under Nagata's leadership the university became the first institution of higher education to receive large-scale funding from the Ministry of Defense in December 2019. According to Alexandra Sakaki and Sebastian Maslow, "illustrating a lack of consensus within the Japanese academic community...the university's official decision has triggered internal backlash and fierce criticism from academic and civic groups." The decision was criticized by the Science Council of Japan and Japanese academics, with critics noting that it reversed the university's December 2018 statement opposing military research.

The university met controversy again in 2020 when Nagata was re-elected as president despite losing the faculty ballot by almost two-thirds of the vote, and the president's selection committee scrapped term limits, allowing Nagata to remain in office indefinitely, prompting a campaign against his presidency among academic staff.

In 2021, journalists discovered discrepancies in the number of international students the university had reported to the Times Higher Education World University Rankings and Japan University Rankings: the 2021 world rankings claimed 20% of the student body were international students, while the Japanese rankings claimed 12.6%. Times Higher Education launched an investigation and advised the university on future data submissions. The erroneous data had also been submitted to the government in the university's 2020 application for designated national university status, and the matter was discussed in the National Diet on 21 April 2021.

== People and alumni organizations ==
The university's alumni association is the Meikeikai (茗渓会), which traces its origins to the normal school founded in 1872 and served as the alumni association of the Tokyo University of Education before being carried over to the University of Tsukuba. Alongside it, several colleges maintain their own alumni societies, including the Tōikai (College of Medicine), the Shinseikai (College of Information Science) and the Tachibanakai (College of Knowledge and Library Sciences). A student support organization, the Shihōkai, subsidizes circle activities and produces university merchandise.

In a 1982 study, the University of Tsukuba ranked fourth in Japan — after the University of Tokyo, Kyoto University and Tohoku University — in its share of university professorships (full-time lecturer and above) held by its graduates, while its own faculty's "self-sufficiency rate" ranked below 18th, reflecting the large proportion of professors from other universities.

== Notable alumni ==
=== Politicians ===
- Kiyoko Ono – 70th chair of the National Public Safety Commission
- Stergomena Tax – 4th executive secretary of the Southern African Development Community

=== Scientists and academics ===
- Toshiko Yuasa – nuclear physicist who worked in France, the first Japanese female physicist
- Emma Haruka Iwao – computer scientist and cloud developer advocate
- Yukihiro Matsumoto – free software programmer, chief designer of the Ruby programming language
- John Maeda – president of the Rhode Island School of Design
- Hiromichi Kataura – researcher on single-wall and double-wall carbon nanotubes
- Eiji Otsuka – social critic, anthropologist and novelist
- Moi Meng Ling – virologist, professor at the University of Tokyo

=== Businesspeople ===
- Kōta Matsuda – CEO of Tully's Coffee Japan
- Akira Morikawa – CEO of LINE Corporation
- Yoshiyuki Sankai – founder and CEO of Cyberdyne

=== Athletes ===
- Takanori Nagase – judo, two-time Olympic gold medalist (2020, 2024), Olympic bronze medalist (2016)
- Yudai Baba – basketball player
- Sawao Kato – gymnastics, eight-time Olympic gold medalist
- Kaoru Mitoma – footballer
- Shogo Taniguchi – footballer
- Saki Kumagai – footballer
- Masami Ihara – footballer
- Masashi Nakayama – footballer
- Kenta Hasegawa – footballer and manager
- Go Oiwa – footballer and manager
- Toshiya Fujita – footballer
- Sōta Hirayama (dropout) – footballer
- Takayoshi Yoshioka – track and field athlete (Tokyo University of Education)
- Miwako Motoyoshi – synchronized swimming, Olympic bronze medalist
- Toshinobu Kawai – short track speed skating, Olympic bronze medalist
- Hirotaka Okada – judo, Olympic bronze medalist
- Yoko Tanabe – judo, Olympic silver medalist
- Noriko Narazaki – judo, Olympic silver and bronze medalist
- Ayumi Tanimoto – judo, Olympic gold medalist
- Naoki Murata – judo, 7th dan, author, curator of the Kodokan Judo Museum
- Kentaro Takahashi – volleyball player

=== Entertainers, artists and writers ===
- Riyoko Ikeda – manga artist (Tokyo University of Education, dropout)
- Ryōko Nagata – voice actor
- Miki Itō – voice actress
- Shunichi Miyamoto – musician
- Ay-O – conceptual artist
- Tian Han – Chinese playwright
- Toshio Iwai – media artist and game designer

== Broadcasting facilities ==
A transmitter of the community radio station Radio Tsukuba (Tsukuba Community Broadcasting) is located in General Research Building B on the Tsukuba campus, with the station's licensed address at 1-1-1 Tennōdai, Tsukuba. The station (call sign JOZZ3BO-FM, 84.2 MHz, 10 W transmitter power, 10.5 W ERP) began broadcasting on 10 October 2008, with a service area covering about 37,910 households.
