= Global Mobile Internet Conference =

The Global Mobile Internet Conference is hosted annually in Beijing and Silicon Valley. Mobile executives, entrepreneurs, developers, and investors from around the globe and across platforms attend GMIC each year.

== History ==
The first annual Global Mobile Internet Conference (GMIC) was hosted in Beijing, China, April 23–25, 2009. The conference, organized by GWC, first aimed to increase the dialogue between mobile internet companies in China and Japan. As the conference became more attended by international attendees, and the attendee base grew from 300 in 2009 to more than 5,000 in 2012, the conference's agenda in 2013 expanded to focus not only on China, but on Asia as a whole, and the opportunity for Western and Asian mobile internet startups and companies to cooperate cross-border.

As of GMIC 2013, GMIC hosts tens of thousands of attendees from more than 60 countries.

GMIC Iterations

- May 26–28, 2010. Beijing, China
- April 26–28, 2011. Beijing, China
- May 9–11, 2012. Beijing, China
- October 19–20, 2012. San Jose, California
- May 7–8, 2013. Beijing, China
- October 21–23, 2013. San Francisco, California
- May 5–6, 2014. Beijing, China
- April 28-May 2, 2016, Beijing, China
- April 28, 2016, Global Virtual Reality Summit, co-organized by DayDayUp in partnership with GMIC, Beijing, China.

== Speakers ==
Previous GMIC Silicon Valley speakers

- Akira Morikawa, CEO, Line
- Andrew Ng, Co-CEO & Co-Founder, Coursera
- Dave McClure, Managing Partner, 500 Startups
- Dave Roberts, CEO, PopCap Games
- Robert Xiao, CEO, Perfect World
- Ed Fries, Co-Creator, Xbox
- Hugo Barra, VP, Xiaomi Global
- Lei Jun, CEO, Xiaomi
- Mark Shuttleworth, Founder, Ubuntu & Canonical
- Martin Lau, President, Tencent
- Paul Graham, Partner, Y-Combinator
- Pavel Durov, Founder, VK & Telegram
- Phil Libin, CEO, Evernote
- Vaughan Smith, VP, Facebook
- Yu Yongfu, CEO, UCWeb
- Yuri Milner, Founder, DST Global

Previous GMIC Beijing Speakers

China

- Pony Ma, CEO, Tencent
- Robin Li, CEO, Baidu
- Charles Chao, CEO, Sina
- Joe Wu, CEO, 91 Mobile
- Lei Jun, CEO, Xiaomi
- Yu Yongfu, CEO, UCWeb
- Xu Xiaoping, Founder, Zhenfund Ventures
- Yang Yuanqing, CEO, Lenovo

India

- Abhinav Mathur, CTO, Spice Mobility
- Naveen Tewari, CEO, InMobi

Indonesia

- Danny Wirianto, CEO, Mindtalk
- Martin Hartano, CEO, GDP Ventures

Japan

- Isao Moriyasu, CEO, DeNA
- Yoshikazu Tanaka, CEO, GREE
- Takeshi Natsuno, Creator, i-mode

Korea

- Min Seo, CEO, Nexon
- James Song, CEO, Gamevil

USA

- David Roberts, CEO, Popcap Games
- Joff Redfern, VP, LinkedIn
- Phil Libin, CEO, Evernote
- Sanjay Poonen, President, SAP
- Connie Chan, Partner, Andreessen Horowitz

Finland

- Marc Dillon, CEO, Jolla
- Peter Vesterbacka, Mighty Eagle, Rovio

Sweden

- Niklas Zennstrom, Founder, Skype

Australia

- Phil Larsen, CMO, Halfbrick (Fruit Ninja)

== Show Highlights ==
According to its website, GMIC highlights how mobile technology is changing every industry including advertising, education, finance, health, gaming, and marketing. As such it has organized tracks including: m-health, m-marketing, m-education, m-next, MoBiz.

GMIC highlights mobile app developers and startups through its competitions: G-Startup, appAttack, and Global Game Stars.

== Headlines from GMIC ==
GMIC Silicon Valley 2013

- CIO Ex-Googler Hugo Barra gushes over Chinese Xiaomi's fanboys
- CIO 'Russian Facebook' CEO Durov disses Zuckerberg, but loves Edward Snowden
- Forbes Here's Where Teens Are Going Instead Of Facebook
- TechCrunch Y Combinator Startups Now Have A Combined Valuation Of $13.7 Billion, Up $2 Billion Since June

GMIC Beijing 2013

- TechCrunch: Evernote, Now With 4M Users In China, Aims For Enterprises With Yinxiang Biji Business
- TechCrunch: Eyeing $4.5B In Sales This Year, Phone Maker Xiaomi Looks To Emulate A 340-Year-Old Chinese Medicine Company
- BusinessWeek: Angry Birds TV Streaming to an IPad Near You
- Engadget: Jolla's Marc Dillon teases world's first Sailfish device, confirms launch in a couple of weeks
- WSJ: Foreign Tech Companies Changing Tune on China
- Financial Times: Chinese mobile browser eyes global markets
