= Link Motion =

Finnish vehicle technology company

Link Motion Ltd.
- Founded: 2001; 25 years ago Finland
- Headquarters: Tampere, Finland
- Area served: Worldwide
- Key people: Pasi Nieminen (CEO)
- Services: Carputer
- Parent: Link Motion Inc
- Website: www.link-motion.com

Link Motion is an automotive software and hardware company developing embedded automotive systems that have been used in the Lamborghini Huracán. Their main product is the Motion T carputer which can implement a connected vehicle gateway as a separate unit or as a part of the cockpit solution (eCockpit). The Motion T carputer runs on NXP's i.MX8 multi-OS platform, supports four in-car HD displays and hosts connectivity features on Microsoft’s connected vehicle platform, a set of services built on the Microsoft Azure cloud, such as over-the-air software and firmware updates, telemetry and diagnostics data and secure remote access.

== How it works ==
Link Motion is a next generation on-board unit hardware and open source powered secure software platform that enables integration of features for connected and smart cars. Link Motion uses Linux and Qt to implement several previously discrete ECU with one computer and relies on ARM TrustZone and virtualization to protect critical system functions from vulnerabilities. An AUTOSAR based operating system in the heart of the carputer is responsible for controlling safety-critical functions and vehicle communication on the controller-area network (CAN bus). It supports central unit, instrument cluster and head-up displays, rear-view cameras, CANopen protocol and it offers connectivity through cellular, vehicle-to-everything (V2X), WiFi and Bluetooth connections as well as location services using GPS, GLONASS and BeiDou. Data is shared and stored in the cloud, and a platform that supports both custom connected car services and others such as Apple CarPlay, Baidu Carlife or Android Auto. Vehicle data can be captured with on-board diagnostics (OBD) which is available using standard OBD-II PIDs.

== New Development ==
Link Motion will further enhance its carputer into a “CarBrain” platform, using artificial intelligence (AI) and blockchain applications to make vehicles a more intelligent part of the traffic ecosystem. They have also integrated Keystone into the platform which is Irdeto’s new smartphone-based vehicle access solution that allows vehicle owners to create and control policies around multi-user vehicle access, settings and usage including ECU-side functionality and cloud services, as well as a complete back-end management system with analytics.

== History ==
Founded in 2001 to develop embedded Linux systems the company was originally called Nomovok. That led to developing mobile operating systems for Nokia and others.

In 2006 they started working on automotive software and embedded automotive systems. Then in 2014 the company was re-branded to Link Motion.

In October 2014, Tieto, Link Motion and Nomovok announced their collaboration on Link Motion.

In January 2015, Link Motion and MTA SpA announced their collaboration on Link Motion.

In March 2015, Link Motion and Red Bend announced strategic cooperation for an over-the-air (OTA) software update solution for Link Motion.

In the summer of 2015 NQ Mobile took a controlling stake in Link Motion.

In August 2016, Link Motion announced it will use Qt technology for the development of the user interface.

In September 2016, Link Motion became a member of the Linux Foundation and Automotive Grade Linux (AGL).

In November 2016, Finland's first autonomous passenger car is pilot licensed. Named Marilyn the car is being developed in the VTT Technical Research Centre of Finland.

In January 2017, Link Motion implemented Cloakware for Automotive by Irdeto into Link Motion’s connected carputer, Motion T.

In May 2017, Finland's first autonomous passenger car is allowed to drive in city traffic.

In November 2017, Link Motion joined the IETA3 APPSTACLE project which aims to include an open and secure car-to-cloud and cloud-to-car platform that interconnects a wide range of cars and transport vehicles to the cloud via open in-car and Internet connection, taking advantage of 5G opportunities.

In December 2017, a partnership with Chery was announced to develop a connected car platform.

In January 2018, Link Motion was selected as the platform vendor for pure electric buses in the city of Qingdao for public transportation vehicles by extending their existing passenger car platform.

In March 2018, Link Motion announced integration of Keystone into the Link Motion CarBrain platform.

== See also ==
- Carputer
- Vehicular communication systems
