= Henry Lin (businessman) =

Chinese business executive

- Born: China
- Education: Beijing University of Posts and Telecommunications
- Occupations: Former chairman, CEO and Founder, NQ Mobile; Board Member, Hesine Technologies Intl Worldwide Inc

Henry Lin (Chinese: 林宇; pinyin: Lín Yǔ) is a co-founder of NQ Mobile a mobile security service provider in China. He was the company's chairman, chief executive officer and chief architect, responsible for overall strategic leadership and product planning. According to a 2011 whitepaper on China's Mobile Security Market by Frost & Sullivan, he led NQ Mobile to a 62% market share in China. He resigned from the company in December 2014.

Lin has dual bachelor's degrees in telecommunications engineering and mechanical electrical engineering, and a Ph.D in communication and information systems from the Beijing University of Posts and Telecommunications.

While working at the Beijing University of Posts and Telecommunications as an associate professor in 2004, Lin became aware of smart phone security concerns and believed mobile security could be an industry for the future. In 2005, Vincent Shi Wen Yong and Lin started NQ Mobile to provide mobile security services.

After co-founding NQ Mobile as a mobile security company in 2005, Lin helped lead the company's expansion into mobile Internet services, which includes mobile security, mobile games and advertising for the consumer market as well as consulting, mobile platforms and mobility services for the enterprise market. The most recent expansion includes mobile health and mobile entertainment.

In October, 2012, Lin became a board member of Hesine Technologies Intl Worldwide Inc., a subsidiary of MediaTek.

Lin has served as advisor to the FCC, pressing for the development of app industry privacy policy standards, and strives to educate consumers on mobile security and data privacy.

== Awards and recognition ==
Lin was given the China Communications Standards Association Science and Technology Progress Award and was one of China's 2009 Top Ten Most Influential People in the cutting-edge mobile phone industry.

Lin was featured in Time Magazine in November 2009, "10 Start-Ups That Will Change Your Life", Tech Pioneers 2010.

The World Economic Forum gave Lin the Technology Pioneer Award in 2011 citing the heavy investment in R&D which resulted in 23 patented and patent-pending technologies in the mobile security market.

On May 6, 2011 Lin was in the CEO Spotlight of the New York Financial Press after ringing the opening bell of the NYSE in commemoration of NQ Mobile's IPO.
