= Z Launcher =

Application launcher for Android by Nokia

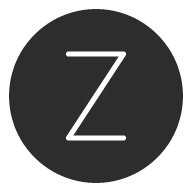

- Screenshot
- Developer: Nokia
- Initial release: June 19, 2014; 11 years ago
- Operating system: Android
- Platform: Android
- Type: Graphical user interface

Z Launcher was an application launcher for Android, created by Nokia. The interface adapts to the user's habitations by predicting six apps, contact actions or web links the user is most likely going to use, depending factors such as time of day, location, and past user behavior and then displays them on the homescreen and changing them when necessary. It also allows the user to scribble a letter on the home screen to launch apps.

The launcher was first announced in June 2014, shortly after the sale of Nokia's mobile phone division to Microsoft. It was on Google Play but updates were halted in 2016 and it was removed from the Google Play Store in 2018.

In November 2014 Nokia announced the N1 tablet for the Chinese market, which comes with Z Launcher as default.

== Reception ==
Z Launcher has been highly praised as one of Android's best launchers. A Pocket Lint review said it is "fun and different" compared to other launchers, whereas BGR called it "shockingly innovative".

== See also ==
- List of Android launchers
