= Robert Seiden =

American lawyer

- Education: New York University; Benjamin Cardozo School of Law (JD)
- Occupation: Litigation lawyer
- Organization: Seiden Law

Robert W. Seiden is an American lawyer and former prosecutor. He is the founder of Seiden Law LLP, a New York–based litigation firm whose matters have included asset recovery, receiverships, and sanctions issues.

== Early life and education ==
Robert W. Seiden received a B.A. from New York University and a J.D. from the Benjamin N. Cardozo School of Law (Yeshiva University).

== Career ==
=== Prosecutorial work ===
After law school, Seiden joined the Manhattan District Attorney’s Office, where he served as an assistant district attorney until 1999 under District Attorney Robert M. Morgenthau, before entering private practice. He later received court appointments as a receiver in cross-border asset-recovery matters.

=== Receiverships and asset recovery ===
Seiden has been appointed by courts as a receiver in a number of matters involving U.S.-listed, China-based issuers:

- ZST Digital Networks — In 2013, Robert W. Seiden, serving as a court-appointed receiver, obtained control of certain company assets and later engaged in settlement discussions with investors.
- Sino Clean Energy — In 2016, Seiden pursued U.S. court actions in his capacity as receiver to recover assets related to the U.S.-listed, China-based issuer after investor complaints about missing funds.
- Link Motion (formerly NQ Mobile) — In February 2019, the U.S. District Court for the Southern District of New York appointed Seiden as temporary receiver in Baliga v. Link Motion Inc. to preserve company assets during the litigation.

Related litigation and commentary on China-focused receiverships have also been covered in the financial press.

=== Other Notable Cases ===
Seiden and his firm have been named concerning several high-profile cases including:

- Proceedings connected to the Israeli Ponzi scheme run by Michael Ben-Ari (EGFE), in which a New York court authorized U.S. asset recovery at the request of an Israeli court–appointed trustee represented in the U.S. by Seiden Law.

- In 2024, plaintiffs represented by Seiden filed a lawsuit in U.S. federal court against the cryptocurrency exchange Binance, alleging that the platform facilitated terrorism financing for Hamas; ABC News reported on the filing and quoted Seiden in his capacity as plaintiffs’ counsel.

- A 2025 report that the Embassy of Pakistan (U.S.) retained Seiden Law for a six-month engagement, with contract terms described in public filings.
