= Akira Morikawa =

Akira Morikawa (森川亮, Morikawa Akira; born 13 January 1969) is the current president of NHN Corporation. Morikawa joined Nippon Television Network Corporation after graduating from the University of Tsukuba in 1989. While serving for the systems division at the TV firm, he got involved in a wide range of media businesses from online advertising and video distribution, mobile service, international broadcast, to BS digital broadcast. Received a Master of Business Administration (MBA) degree from Aoyama Gakuin University in 1999. Joined Sony Corp. in 2000, where he was in charge of new mobile content and broadband businesses and was responsible for overall content business, including business/service planning and sales. Joined Hangame Japan (predecessor of NHN Japan) in 2003, where he served as general manager overseeing overall gaming business and then as director, before becoming vice president in October 2006. Appointed president in October 2007 and doubled as president of newly established Naver Japan the following month. Remained president of NHN Japan after the company, Naver Japan and Livedoor Co. merged to form the NHN Japan group in January 2012.
