= NewBornTown =

Chinese mobile internet company

NewBorn Town
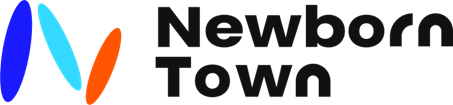
- Company type: Hong Kong Listed Company
- Industry: Social Networking, Entertainment
- Founded: 2009
- Founder: Liu Chunhe, Li Ping
- Headquarters: Room 2613, 99 Queen’s Road Central, HKSAR, PRC
- Area served: Worldwide
- Products: MICO, YoHo, TopTop, SUGO, HeeSay
- Website: www.newborntown.com

Newborn Town Inc. (Chinese: 赤子城; pinyin: chì zǐ chéng) is a global technology company founded in 2009, which became listed on the Main Board of the Hong Kong Stock Exchange (HKEX) in 2019 under the stock code 9911.

Newborn Town has developed a portfolio of social networking applications. Newborn Town’s business.

== History ==
In December 2019, Newborn Town was listed on the main board of the Hong Kong Stock Exchange under the stock code "09911", with an issue price of HKD 1.68 per share.

In August of 2023, the company completed the acquisition of BlueCity, and its performance has been incorporated into the company's consolidated financial statements.

Response to 2023 Earthquakes in Turkey and Syria

In February 2023, in response to the earthquake in Turkey and Syria, Newborn Town initiated an aid campaign engaging its users to support those impacted by the disaster. The company’s local teams visited the affected cities to provide humanitarian aid. Additionally, MICO and YoHo launched livestreams to provide real-time updates and support to the disaster-stricken areas.

In January 2024, Newborn Town launched the LGBTQ+ online content community HeeSay.
