= Doreso =

Automatic content recognition company

- Website type: Automatic content recognition (ACR) company
- Dissolved: 2017
- Owners: ACRCloud (2013); NQ Mobile (2013-2017)
- Creator: ACRCloud
- Website: http://www.doreso.com
- Commercial: Yes
- Registration: Optional
- Launched: January 2013

Doreso is an automatic content recognition (ACR) company specialized in music discovery and social TV recognition service for the second screen. Their sound-to-sound music search engine allows users to obtain more detailed information about music and songs by singing, humming or by recording original music.

== Features ==
The music search currently has three ways of searching music: by identifying a recorded original music fragment; by humming or singing the melody using a microphone; and by direct input of the name of a song or singer. Users can share their search results on Facebook, Twitter or other SNS website and get similar music recommendations. The app also gives information about the song title, its singer and allows you to purchase the song.

== History ==
The Music Radar team got 1st place in the Query by Singing/Humming (QBSH) task at the Music Information Retrieval Evaluation eXchange (MIREX) in 2012 and 2013. The app was launched at the end of January 2013, supporting query by singing/humming and audio fingerprinting. The app reached its first one million user milestone in April 2013. In May 2013, Music Radar announced that they had integrated deep learning techniques into their software to improve the rate of recognition. In July 2013, Music Radar released their cloud based music recognition open API to the public.

== See also ==
- Search by sound
- Query by humming
