= ACRCloud =

Automatic content recognition tools

- Type: Private
- Industry: Automatic content recognition, Audio fingerprinting, Music recognition, Interactive TV
- Headquarters: Singapore
- Products: Automatic Content Recognition platform
- Subsidiaries: Doreso (2013)
- Website: https://www.acrcloud.com

ACRCloud (Formerly Syntec TV) is an automatic content recognition platform based on acoustic fingerprinting technology. Its creator intended to help media, broadcasters and app developers to identify, monitor and monetize content on the second screen.

ACRCloud allows users to upload their own content and ingest live feeds for audio identification and broadcast monitoring. Beyond that, ACRCloud has indexed over 150 million tracks in its music fingerprinting database. ACRCloud launch a worldwide radio station database with over 30,000 radio stations in July 2018, it enables the clients to monitor music and their custom content on the radio station without collecting the stream URLs of the stations.

== Features ==
The major services from ACRCloud are music recognition, content monitoring, live and pre-taped content identification and triggering, it also offers broadcast monitoring, audio measurement, copyright compliance solutions.

For developers, ACRCloud supports Android, iOS, Java, Python, Node.js SDKs and SDKs for other programming languages.

== Clients ==
Clients include: Anghami, Xiaomi, Musixmatch, Huawei Music, Genius mobile app, Deezer, Alibaba, Cartoon Network, Baidu and DTS.

== See also ==
- Automatic content recognition
- List of music software
