= Home screen =

Main screen on a mobile operating system

A home screen, homescreen, or start screen is the main screen on a device or computer program. Home screens are not identical because users rearrange icons as they please, and home screens often differ across mobile operating systems. Almost every smartphone has some form of home screen, which typically displays links to applications, settings, and notifications.

== Common features ==
Home screens usually consist of a grid of application links or shortcuts that can often be arranged over multiple pages, and serve as the user's main method of accessing phone functions. Home screens also tend to include a dock along an edge of the screen, where application links can be stored and accessed from any page on the home screen. Most operating systems allow users to add folders to the home screen in order to further organize application links. Some home screens may also include a panel where push notifications are displayed or select system settings can be accessed.

In addition to applications links, many home screens are also capable of displaying ambient information, such as live tiles on Windows Phone or widgets on Android. Such tiles or widgets may link to applications, however they differ from traditional links in that they show current, dynamic information instead of a static icon. However, the increased relevance of the information can come at the cost of device battery life, bandwidth, and the ease of recognition afforded by static application icons.

== Alternative home screens ==
Although most home screens have a similar structure, not all are designed in common. Two notable examples of less-common home screens paradigms include Siri and WebOS. The former is Apple's natural language user interface, which performs functions similar to more traditional home screens such as opening applications, displaying relevant data, and managing phone settings. The latter is notable for its use of entirely dynamic application icons that mimic the current state of the application, similar to task managers on other mobile operating systems.

Although most mobile operating systems include a default home screen, some devices also allow the user to replace the native home screen with a different application or third-party home screen, allowing for additional home screen paradigms.

== History ==
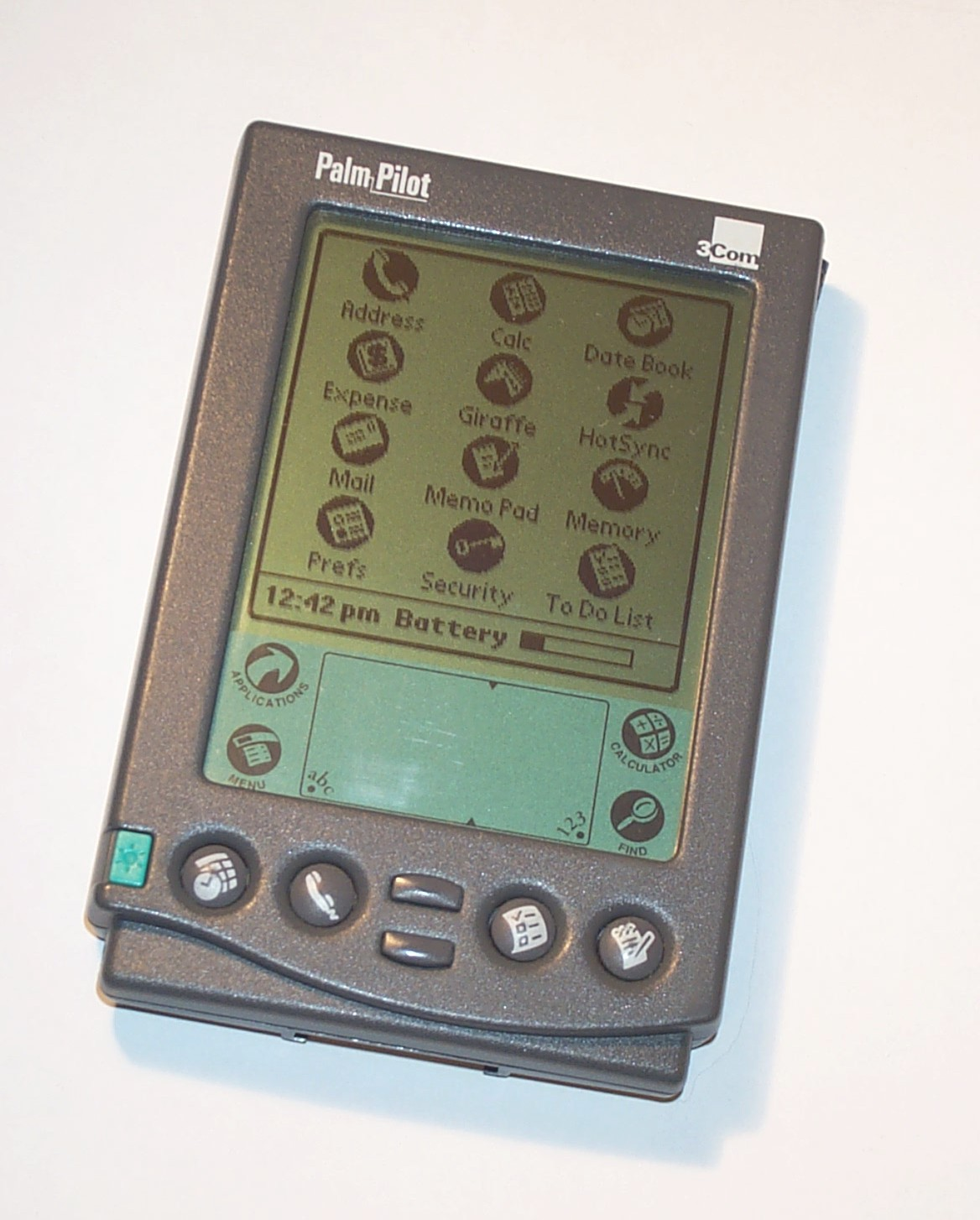
The home screen on a PalmPilot Professional

One of the first examples of a home screen can be found on the PalmPilot, which debuted in 1997. Early home screens were often less customizable than current iterations. For example, early versions of iOS did not allow users to rearrange applications on the home screen or change the background image.

Because home screens often serve as the main method for interacting with mobile operating systems, they tend to change slowly, if at all, across updates to the operating system.

== See also ==
- Mobile operating system
- Smartphone
- Home page
- Comparison of desktop application launchers
- List of Android launchers
