= SPB Software =

Russian IT company

SPB Software Inc.
- Industry: Mobile application development
- Founded: 1999; 27 years ago
- Key people: Sebastian-Justus Schmidt (CEO); Vassili Philippov (COO); Yaroslav Goncharov (CTO); Juggs Ravalia (VP); Olga Steidl (CMO)
- Products: user interfaces for mobile devices, system, communication, business, multimedia software, games
- Parent: Yandex
- Website: www.spbsoft.com

SPB Software, a division of Yandex, is a Russian IT company which operates the largest search engine in Russia. In November 2011, Bloomberg Businessweek reported that Yandex acquired SPB Software after its own initial public offering debuted on the NASDAQ as the fourth largest IPO of 2011. SPB Software's most popular solution, the SPB Shell 3D, has been described by The New York Times as an application that makes for a much more user-friendly phone. SPB Shell 3D utilizes SPB Software's SPB UI Engine, a cross-platform modular plugin for building hyper-realistic 3D interfaces on a variety of devices. The SPB UI Engine is written in native C++. SPB also develops software running on Android, iOS, Symbian, Bada, BlackBerry, Maemo, MeeGo, webOS, Windows Phone 7, and the Windows Mobile operating systems.

== History ==
=== Formation ===
Formed in Saint Petersburg, Russia, in 1999, the company was named SPB Software House, but removed the word "House" in 2008. The company released its first mobile application in 2001 and went on to win the Pocket PC Developer Of The Year Award 2003 by Handango. The company subsequently won the same award from Handango in 2006, 2007, and 2009. SPB Software went on to develop mobile apps for a variety of platforms and expanded its title lineup to include games, utility apps and mobile OS shells. SPB Software is now developing apps for all of the major mobile phone manufacturers. SPB Software also works with phone makers and mobile operators in various countries to develop customized versions of its software and optimized applications for particular devices.

=== Acquisition ===
On November 28, 2011, Bloomberg Businessweek reported that Yandex NV, operator of Russia’s most popular Internet search engine, acquired SPB Software "to expand mobile products and the use of its search capabilities on mobile devices." The CEO of SPB Software, Sebastian-Justus Schmidt, was appointed as EVP Mobile and General Manager by Yandex.

== Products ==
=== Games ===
SPB Software has released an assortment of games for smartphones and mobile devices. SPB Brain Evolution was named the bestselling Windows Mobile game of 2008 and as the Best Casual Game of 2009 by the online mobile software store Handango.

== Headquarters ==
SPB Software's development headquarters are located in Saint-Petersburg, Russia. Financial Headquarters are located in Hong Kong. The firm also has offices in USA, Brazil, Taiwan, and Thailand.
