= Beijing University of Posts and Telecommunications =

Public university in Beijing, China

- 北京邮电大学
- Seal of BUPT
- Former names: Beijing Institute of Posts and Telecommunications (北京邮电学院)
- Motto: 厚德博学、敬业乐群
- Motto in English: Great Virtue, Profound Knowledge, Total Commitment, Harmonious Cooperation
- Type: Public
- Established: 1955; 71 years ago
- Chancellor: YE Peida (叶培大)
- President: XU Kun (徐坤)
- Party Secretary: XU Mei (续梅)
- Faculty: 2400
- Students: 27,000
- Undergraduates: 15,000
- Postgraduates: 12,000
- Location: Beijing, China; 39°57′46″N 116°21′29″E
- Colors: Blue
- Nickname: Bei You
- Website: bupt.edu.cn

Chinese name
- Simplified Chinese: 北京邮电大学
- Traditional Chinese: 北京郵電大學
Transcriptions
Standard Mandarin
- Hanyu Pinyin: Běijīng Yóudiàn Dàxué
- Wade–Giles: Pei^{3}-ching^{1} Yu^{2}-tien^{4} Ta^{4}-hsüeh^{2}
- IPA: [pèɪ.tɕíŋ iǔ.tjɛ̂n tâ.ɕɥě]
Yue: Cantonese
- Jyutping: Bak^{1}-ging^{1} Jau^{4}-din^{6} Daai^{6}-hok^{6}
- IPA: [pɐk̚˥.kɪŋ˥ jɐw˩.tin˨ taj˨.hɔk̚˨]

Alternative Chinese name
- Chinese: 北邮
Transcriptions
Standard Mandarin
- Hanyu Pinyin: Běiyóu

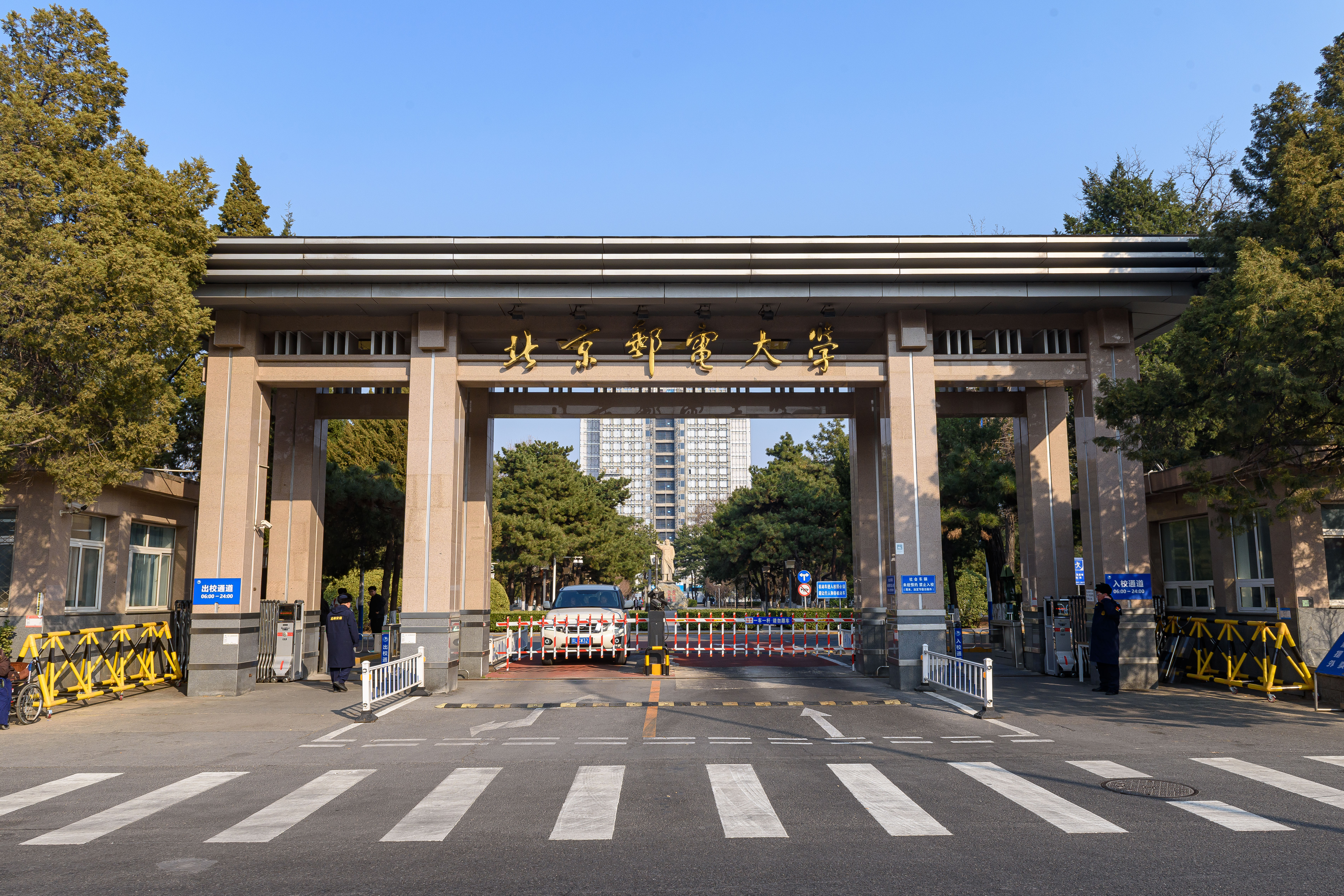
Main gate of Beijing University of Posts and Telecommunications

The Beijing University of Posts and Telecommunications (北京邮电大学; BUPT) is a public university in Beijing, China. The university is affiliated with the Ministry of Education, and co-funded by the Ministry of Education and the Ministry of Industry and Information Technology. It is part of Project 211 and the Double First-Class Construction.

The Beijing University of Posts and Telecommunications, formerly known as Beijing Institute of Posts and Telecommunications, was founded in 1955.

== Schools and institutes ==
Schools and institutes
School of Future
School of Information and Communication Engineering
School of Electronic Engineering
School of Computer Science (National Pilot Software Engineering School)
School of Cyberspace Security
School of Artificial Intelligence
School of Modern Post (School of Automation)
School of Economics and Management
School of Sciences
School of Humanities
School of Digital Media and Design Arts
International School (Queen Mary School)
School of Marxism
Queen Mary School Hainan
School of Continuing Education
School of Emergency Management
School of Excellence in Engineering

== Faculty and staff ==
- Aidong Men (born 1966), professor and doctoral tutor

University rankings

Global – Overall
- QS World: 1001-1200 (2026)

== Notable alumni ==
=== Honors ===
Discovered by astronomers with the Beijing Schmidt CCD Asteroid Program, asteroid 101810 Beiyou was named in honor of the university. The official naming citation was published by the Minor Planet Center on 24 September 2020 (M.P.C. 125471).
