= Computational musicology =

Interdisciplinary research area between musicology and computer science

Computational musicology is an interdisciplinary research area between musicology and computer science. Computational musicology includes any disciplines that use computation in order to study music. It includes sub-disciplines such as mathematical music theory, computer music, systematic musicology, music information retrieval, digital musicology, sound and music computing, and music informatics. As this area of research is defined by the tools that it uses and its subject matter, research in computational musicology intersects with both the humanities and the sciences. The use of computers in order to study and analyze music generally began in the 1960s, although musicians have been using computers to assist them in the composition of music beginning in the 1950s. Today, computational musicology encompasses a wide range of research topics dealing with the multiple ways music can be represented.

== History ==
This history of computational musicology as a discipline began in the middle of the 20th century. The field is considered to be an extension of a much longer history of intellectual inquiry in music that overlaps with science, mathematics, technology, and archiving.

=== 1960s ===
Early approaches to computational musicology began in the early 1960s and were being fully developed by 1966. At this point in time data entry was done primarily with paper tape or punch cards and was computationally limited. Due to the high cost of this research, projects tended to ask global questions and look for global solutions in order to be funded. One of the earliest symbolic representation schemes was the Digital Alternate Representations of Music or DARMS. The project was supported by Columbia University and the Ford Foundation between 1964 and 1976. The project was one of the initial large scale projects to develop an encoding scheme that incorporated completeness, objectivity, and encoder-directedness. Other work at this time at Princeton University, chiefly driven by Arthur Mendel and implemented by Michael Kassler and Eric Regener, helped push forward the Intermediary Musical Language (IML) and Music Information Retrieval (MIR) languages that later fell out of popularity in the late 1970s. The 1960s also marked a time of documenting bibliographic initiatives such as the Repertoire International de Literature Musicale (RILM) created by Barry Brook in 1967.

=== 1970s ===
Unlike the global research interests of the 1960s, goals in computational musicology in the 1970s were driven by accomplishing certain tasks. This task driven motivation lead to the development of MUSTRAN for music analysis by led by Jerome Wenker and Dorothy Gross at Indiana University. Similar projects like SCORE (SCORE-MS) at Stanford University were developed primarily for printing purposes.

=== 1980s ===
The 1980s were the first decade to move away from centralized computing and toward personal computing. This transference of resources led to growth in the field as a whole. John Walter Hill began developing a commercial program called Savy PC that was meant to help musicologists analyze lyrical content in music. Findings from Hill's project were able to reveal patterns in the conversions of sacred and secular texts where only first lines of texts were changed. In keeping with the global questions that dominated the 1960s, Helmuth Schaffrath began his Essen Folk Collection encoded in Essen Associative Code (ESAC) which has since been converted to humdrum notation. Using software developed at the time, Sandra Pinegar examined 13th century music theory manuscripts in her doctoral work at Columbia University in order to gain evidence on the dating and authoring of texts. The 1980s also introduced MIDI notation.

== Methods ==
Computational musicology can be generally divided into three main branches corresponding to the ways music can be represented by a computer: sheet music data, symbolic data, and audio data. Sheet music data refers to the human-readable, graphical representation of music via symbols. Examples of this branch of research would include digitizing scores ranging from 15th Century neumenal notation to contemporary Western music notation. Like sheet music data, symbolic data refers to musical notation in a digital format, but symbolic data is not human readable and is encoded in order to be parsed by a computer. Examples of this type of encoding include piano roll, kern, and MIDI representations. Lastly, audio data refers to recording of the representations of the acoustic wave or sound that results from changes in the oscillations of air pressure. Examples of this type of encoding include MP3 or WAV files.

=== Sheet music data ===
Sheet music is meant to be read by the musician or performer. Generally, the term refers to the standardized nomenclature used by a culture to document their musical notation. In addition to music literacy, musical notation also demands choices from the performer. For example, the notation of Hindustani ragas will begin with an alap that does not demand a strict adherence to a beat or pulse, but is left up to the discretion of the performer. The sheet music notation captures the sequence of gestures the performer is encouraged to make within a musical culture, but is by no means fixed to those performance choices.

=== Symbolic data ===
Symbolic data refers to musical encoding that is able to be parsed by a computer. Unlike sheet music data, any type of digital data format may be considered symbolic as it is generated from a finite set of symbols. Symbolic data typically does not have any sort of performative choices required on the part of the performer. Two of the most common software choices for analyzing symbolic data are David Huron's Humdrum Toolkit and Michael Scott Cuthbert's music21.

=== Audio data ===
Audio data is generally conceptualized as existing on a continuum of features ranging from lower to higher level audio features. Low-level audio features refer to loudness, spectral flux, and cepstrum. Mid-level audio features refer to pitch, onsets, and beats. Examples of high-level audio features include style, artist, mood, and key.

== Applications ==
=== Music databases ===
One of the earliest applications in computational musicology was the creation and use of musical databases. Input, usage and analysis of large amounts of data can be very troublesome using manual methods while usage of computers can make such tasks considerably easier.

=== Analysis of music ===
Various computer programs have been developed to analyze musical data. Data formats vary from standard notation to raw audio. Analysis of formats that are based on storing all properties of each note, for example MIDI, were used originally and are still among the most common methods. Significant advances in analysis of raw audio data have been made only recently.

=== Artificial production of music ===
Different algorithms can be used to both create complete compositions and improvise music. One of the methods by which a program can learn improvisation is analysis of choices a human player makes while improvising. Artificial neural networks are used extensively in such applications.

=== Historical change and music ===
One developing sociomusicological theory in computational musicology is the "Discursive Hypothesis" proposed by Kristoffer Jensen and David G. Hebert, which suggests that "because both music and language are cultural discourses (which may reflect social reality in similarly limited ways), a relationship may be identifiable between the trajectories of significant features of musical sound and linguistic discourse regarding social data." According to this perspective, analyses of "big data" may improve our understandings of how particular features of music and society are interrelated and change similarly across time, as significant correlations are increasingly identified within the musico-linguistic spectrum of human auditory communication.

=== Non-western music ===
Strategies from computational musicology are recently being applied for analysis of music in various parts of the world. For example, professors affiliated with the Birla Institute of Technology in India have produced studies of harmonic and melodic tendencies (in the raga structure) of Hindustani classical music.

== Research ==
RISM's (Répertoire International des Sources Musicales) database is one of the world's largest music databases, containing over 700,000 references to musical manuscripts. Anyone can use its search engine to find compositions.

The Centre for History and Analysis of Recorded Music (CHARM) has developed the Mazurka Project, which offers "downloadable recordings . . . analytical software and training materials, and a variety of resources relating to the history of recording."

== Computational musicology in popular culture ==
Research from computational musicology occasionally is the focus of popular culture and major news outlets. Examples of this include reporting in The New Yorker regarding musicologists Nicholas Cook and Craig Sapp who, while working on the Centre for the History and Analysis of Recorded Music (CHARM) at the University of London, discovered the fraudulent recording of pianist Joyce Hatto. On the 334th birthday of Johann Sebastian Bach, Google celebrated the occasion with a Google Doodle that allowed individuals to enter their own score into the interface, then have a machine learning model called Coconet harmonize the melody.

== See also ==
- Algorithmic composition
- Comparison of free software for audio
- Computer models of musical creativity
- Music cognition
- Cognitive musicology
- Musicology
- Artificial neural network
- MIDI
- MusiXTeX - open source music engraving macros and fonts that allow music typesetting in TeX
- JFugue
