= Ultre =

- Born: Finn McNicholas; 26 September 1981 (age 44)
- Origin: England
- Genres: Electronic music, IDM
- Occupations: Musician, remixer, sound designer, Foley artist
- Instruments: Synthesizer, electronics, laptop, Guitar, Softsynth, drum machine, laptop computer, sampler, piano
- Years active: 2006–present
- Labels: Audiobulb Records, Mesk Records

Finn McNicholas aka Ultre (born 26 September 1981) is an electronic music musician from England.

== Discography ==
=== Albums ===
- 2010 Tape/Recorder

=== EP's ===
- 2009 Watch Your Thoughts EP Northern Resource records

=== Singles and promos ===
2009 Watch Your Thoughts EP (promo, 12") Mesk Records

=== Videos ===
- 2007 Ultre – Ionisation (Short film directed by Flat-e)
- 2007 Ultre – Shadowplay (Short film directed by Flat-e)

=== Tracks appear on ===
- 2006 Another Generic Label Sampler Vol. 1,000,000 Concrete Plastic
- 2006 Overkill
- 2006 Exhibition #3 Audiobulb Records

== See also ==
- Mesk Records
