= Nime =

Nime, NIME, Nimes, and similar terms may refer to:

== Places ==
- Nîmes, a city in Gard, Occitanie, southern France

== Events ==
- New Interfaces for Musical Expression (NIME), a music science conference
