= 3C 382 =

Broad-line radio galaxy located in the constellation Lyra

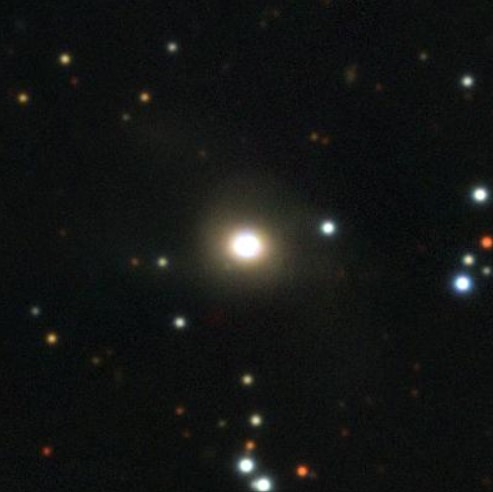
- The radio galaxy 3C 382.

Observation data (J2000 epoch)
- Constellation: Lyra
- Right ascension: 18^{h} 35^{m} 03.3900^{s}
- Declination: +32° 41′ 46.857″
- Redshift: 0.055565
- Heliocentric radial velocity: 16,658 km/s
- Distance: 762 Mly
- Apparent magnitude (V): 15.39
- Apparent magnitude (B): 16.50

Characteristics
- Type: BLRG, Sy1
- Notable features: Broad-line radio galaxy

Other designations
- CTA 80, PGC 62082, DA 457, 4C 32.55, 2MASX J18350342+3241471, NRAO 570, PBC J1835.0+3241, TXS 1833+326

3C 382 is a nearby broad-line radio galaxy located in the constellation of Lyra, located at a redshift of (z) 0.058. First discovered as an astronomical radio source in 1963 and identified with its optical counterpart in 1973, the galaxy is classified as a Fanaroff-Riley class II radio galaxy. Its X-ray luminosity is estimated to be 7×10^{44} erg/s in the 0.2–2.4 keV band.

== Description ==
The host galaxy of 3C 382 is an elliptical galaxy located in a rich environment. It contains a nucleus like other galaxies although it is described being bright and unsolved with a smooth galactic halo. In addition, the host is also found to be interacting with its companion, a large barred spiral galaxy located 85.1 arcseconds away with a position angle of 67.7°. There is a loop formed by the two long filaments connected to both galaxies.

Very Large Array radio imaging of 3C 382 shows the source has a wider extension of more than 2 arcmin. Its radio structure is double-lobed and it has a jet originating from its northern radio lobe which terminates at a hotspot region. The southern radio lobe of 3C 382 also has a hotspot region, but has no clear indication of a counterpart jet although detections of low polarization are present. Very-long-baseline interferometry observations at 8.4 GHz also showed the jet is extended.

A low-brightness tail can be seen in its eastern component leading back to the host galaxy. Furthermore, the northeast component's ridge line of 3C 382 shows a wiggle extending in a southwest direction from the outer hotspot, subsequently heading west and southwest again before joining the main component.

A large amplitude outburst was detected in 3C 382 in mid-1977 which lasted for a month on a time scale. Although its infrared flux was found to be constant during the outburst onset, it displayed increased levels at 2.28 μm in 1978. Furthermore, the extension of the spectral flux distribution flattened between the values of 2.20 and 10 μm. In 1985, EXOSAT observations detected another outburst in the galaxy where its medium and low energy spectra showed maximum to minimum variations of 120% and 110% respectively.

The supermassive black hole in 3C 382 is estimated to be (1.0±0.3)×10^{9} M_{☉} based on a reverberation mapping. Parsec-scale disk wind was also detected by Chandra X-ray Observatory in 2009.
