= Music informatics =

The study of music processing

Music informatics is the interdisciplinary study of music using computational methods, including music representation, audio analysis, synchronization, structural analysis and chord recognition.

Other music informatics research topics include computational music modeling (symbolic, distributed, etc.), computational music analysis, optical music recognition, digital audio editors, online music search engines, music information retrieval and cognitive issues in music.

== Sub-topics in Music Informatics research ==
- interdisciplinary relationships in music informatics
- the digital revolution in music and its impact on music information services and music libraries
- knowledge of current trends in music technologies including software and hardware
- mental models in the cognition of music listening and performing
- symbolic music modeling systems and computer-aided composition
- social and economic realities of the consumption of music in Western societies
- improvisation in music, especially where it is facilitated by music technology
- music digital libraries and collections architectures
- future of music distribution, the music industry, and music libraries
- music information retrieval
- music recommendation systems
- studying and synthesizing music expression
- audio signal-to-score (singing, polyphonic, piano, etc.)
- musical analysis
- musical accompaniment systems
- score following
- optical music recognition (OMR)
- music source separation
- music for computer games
- MIDI-to-symbolic-score conversion

== Music informatics in education ==
As an academic subject, music informatics overlaps with music technology, but places greater emphasis on the computational principles underlying musical applications. Informatics students will not just use existing music hardware and software, but will learn programming and artificial intelligence.

== See also ==
- generative music
- music mining software
- New Interfaces for Musical Expression
