= Songs2See =

Application for music learning, practice and gaming

- Developer: Fraunhofer IDMT
- Website: http://www.songs2see.com

Songs2See is an application for music learning, practice and gaming developed by the Fraunhofer Institute for Digital Media Technology in Ilmenau - Germany and distributed by the company Songquito UG (haftungsbeschränkt).

== Features ==
Songs2See is composed of two main applications: the Songs2See Game, used at practice time, and the Songs2See Editor, used for exercise content creation The main advantages of Songs2See are:

- Users can play their own musical instruments to the computer microphone without the need of a game controller. Currently, guitar, voice, piano, saxophone, trumpet, bass and flute are supported.
- Users can create their own musical exercise content simply by importing audio files and using all the analysis features of the Songs2See Editor.

== The Songs2See Game ==
The Songs2See Game is an application where a selected music piece can be practiced in a gaming environment. Besides real-time performance feedback, the game also offers different visual aids to guide users through the performance.

=== Game View ===
The Game View is a scrolling score-like animation that displays in real-time the melody to be played. Note durations are displayed both as blue bars of different lengths and as real notes (eighth notes, sixteenth notes, etc.). Note pitches are indicated both by the location of the note objects in the staff and by note names placed inside the note heads. Indications about key, accidentals, time signature and bars are also included.

=== Instrument View ===
The Instrument View displays the selected instrument and a real-time fingering animation that guides users through the performance of the selected piece. Green signs are used to show the current fingering and blue signs are used to show the next fingering in the melody.

=== Practice Content ===
Songs2See is delivered with a set of popular songs and instrument specific practice material for the user to play. Additionally, users can create their own content for the game using the Songs2See Editor.

=== Options ===
Different options can be modified in the Songs2See game, including performance loops, learning mode, note names, left-hand mode for guitar and bass players, microphone set up, game delay, etc.

== The Songs2See Editor ==
The Songs2See Editor is an application that allows users to create their own personal content for the Songs2See Game. Additionally, the different possibilities within the editor make it compatible with popular score-writing and sequencer software.

=== Import Options ===
Users can create content for the game starting from different types of format files and audio material: WAV, MP3, MIDI and MusicXML are currently supported.

=== Analysis Options ===
The Songs2See Editor analysis options include automatic main melody transcription, beat and key analysis, solo and backing track creation, different instrument transposition, efficient and easy editing of results, etc. These analysis options are direct research results from the Music Information Retrieval community.

=== Export Options ===
Every Songs2See Editor session can be exported for the Songs2See Game. Additionally, intermediate results can also be exported to be used in other applications: solo and backing tracks can be exported as audio files and transcription results can be exported as MIDI or MusicXML.

== Availability ==
The Songs2See Game is a platform independent flash-based application available both as desktop or web application. The Songs2See Editor is currently only available for Windows systems.

== History ==
The Songs2See project started in 2010 as a collaboration between the Fraunhofer Institute for Digital Media Technology and European partners as Grieg Music Education, Tampere University, Kids Interactive GmbH and Sweets for Brains GmbH. The project was funded by the Thuringian Ministry of Economy, Employment and Technology in the attempt to enable transnational cooperation between Thuringian companies and their partners from other European regions. After the conclusion of the project in March 2012, the company Songquito UG (haftungsbeschränkt) took over the commercialization, distribution and further development of Songs2See.

== See also ==
- Music video game
- Music Information Retrieval
