= Shizuoka University of Art and Culture =

Art school in Hamamatsu, Japan

Coordinates: 34°42′46″N 137°44′19″E

- 静岡文化芸術大学
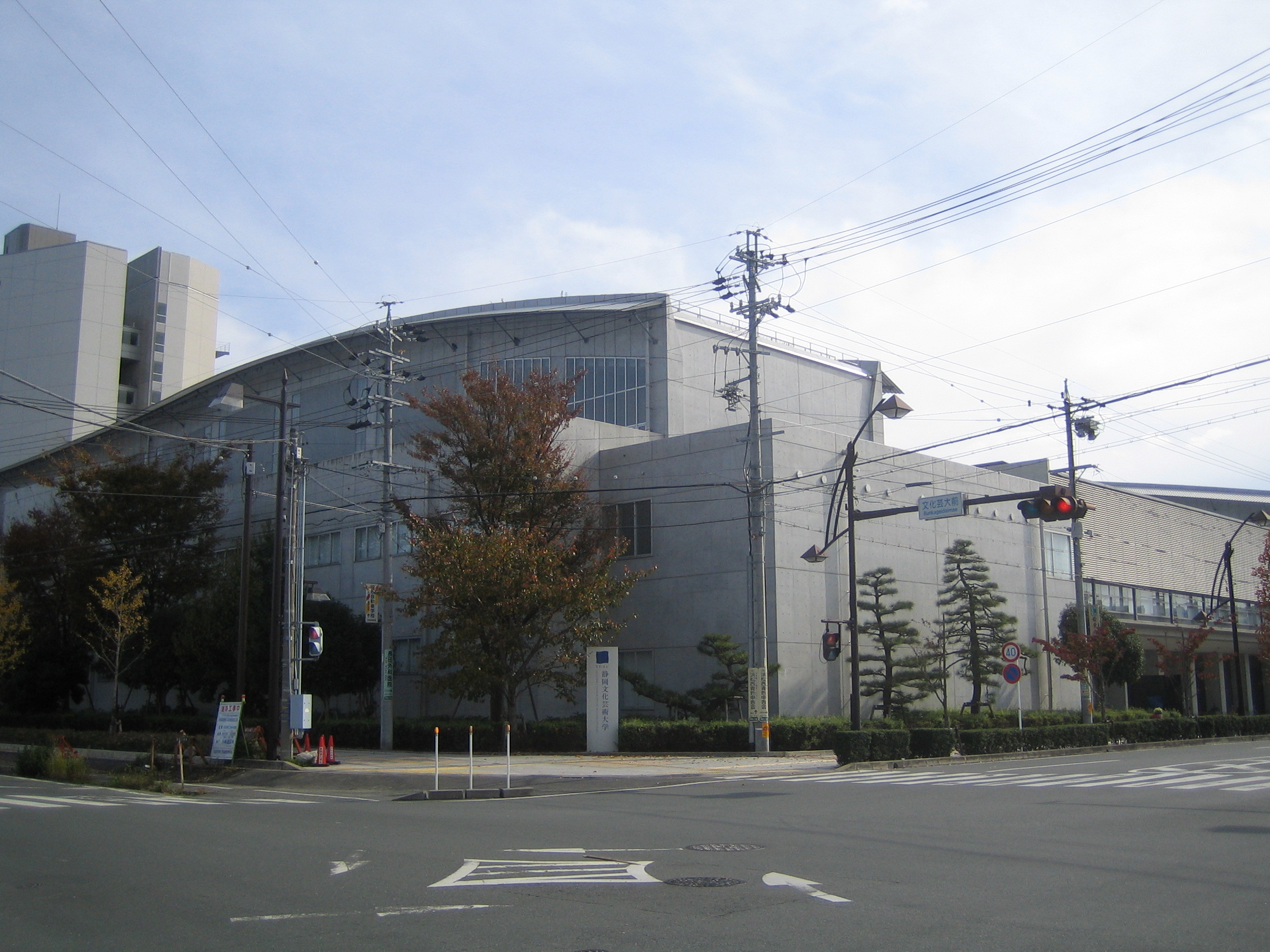
- Shizuoka University of Art and Culture
- Type: Public
- Established: 1999
- Location: 2-1-1 Chuo, Naka-ku, Hamamatsu-shi, Shizuoka-ken 437-8555, Hamamatsu, Shizuoka, Japan
- Nickname: SUAC

The Shizuoka University of Art and Culture (静岡文化芸術大学, Shizuoka Bunka Geijutsu Daigaku) is a public university in Hamamatsu, in Shizuoka Prefecture, Japan.

== Mission ==
Its mission is to foster the exchange of ideas between the fields of cultural studies and design by having the two combined at one relatively small institution.

== History ==
SUAC is one of Japan's newest universities, established in December 1999 and enrolling its first class in April 2000. SUAC hosted NIME-04, the 4th International Conference on New interfaces for musical expression in June 2004. The conference featured public invited lectures by synthesizer pioneer Bob Moog and media artist Toshio Iwai.

== Faculties ==
The university has two faculties, the Faculty of Cultural Policy and Management and the Faculty of Design. Within the Faculty of Cultural Policy and Management there are departments of International Culture, Regional Cultural Policy and Management, and Art Management. Within the Faculty of Design there are departments of Industrial Design, Art and Science, and Space and Architecture.

== Architecture ==
The campus's architecture is somewhat unusual, dominated by large undulating rooftops, one of which is topped with a roof garden.

== Partner universities ==
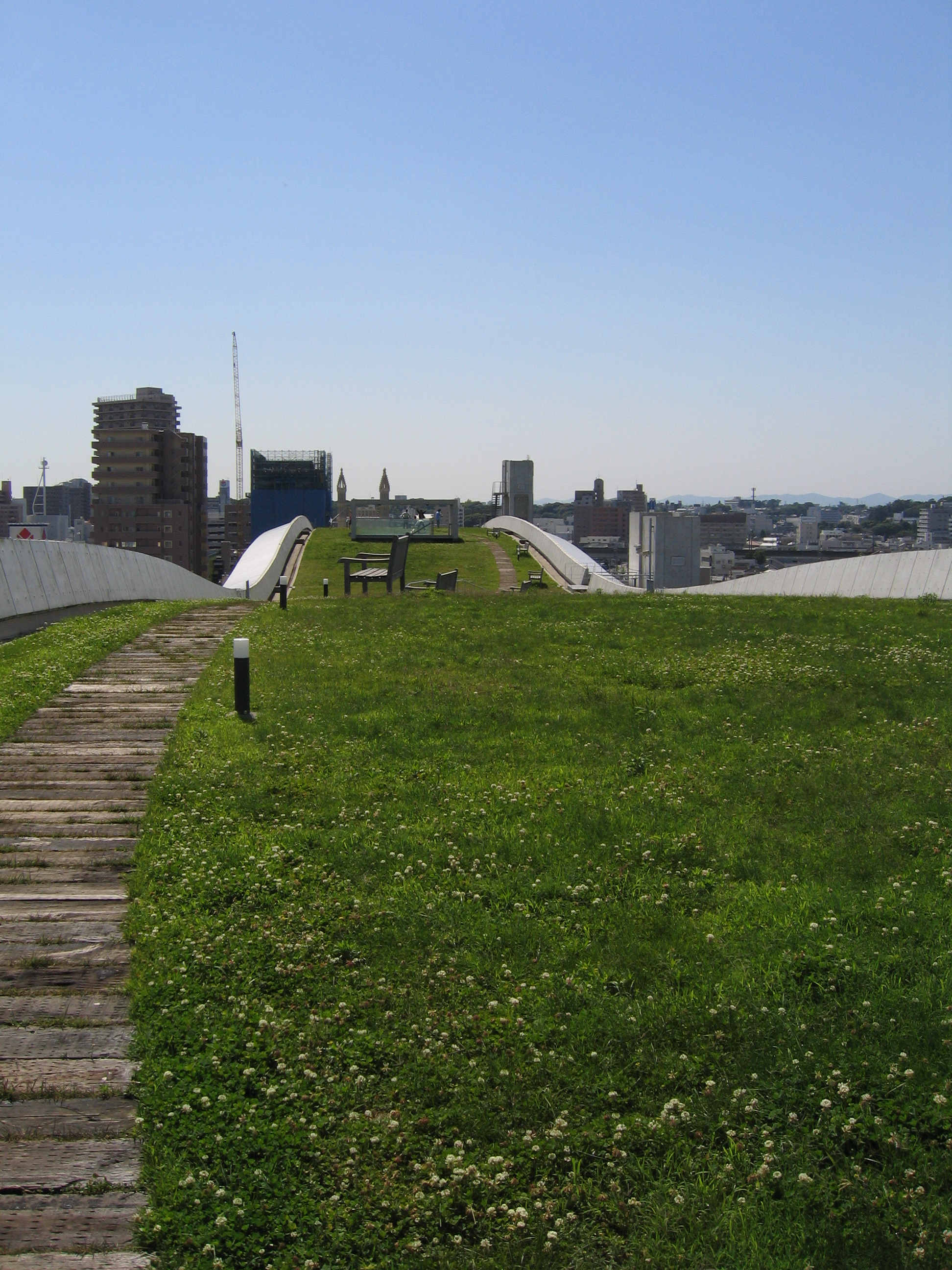
Roof garden

The university has reciprocal relationships with Hoseo University in South Korea, the Shanghai University of Engineering Sciences in China, the University of Wales in Wales, and the University of Findlay in the United States.
