= Prefix (acoustics) =

Auditory perception in acoustics

In acoustics, the prefix of a sound is an initial phase, the onset of a sound quite dissimilar to the ensuing lasting vibration.

The term was coined by J. F. Schouten (1968, 42), who called it one of at least five major acoustic parameters that determine the elusive attributes of timbre.

== See also ==
- Onset (audio)
- Roland D-50
- Timbre#Attributes
- Synthesizer#ADSR envelope
- Transient (acoustics)
