= David Huron =

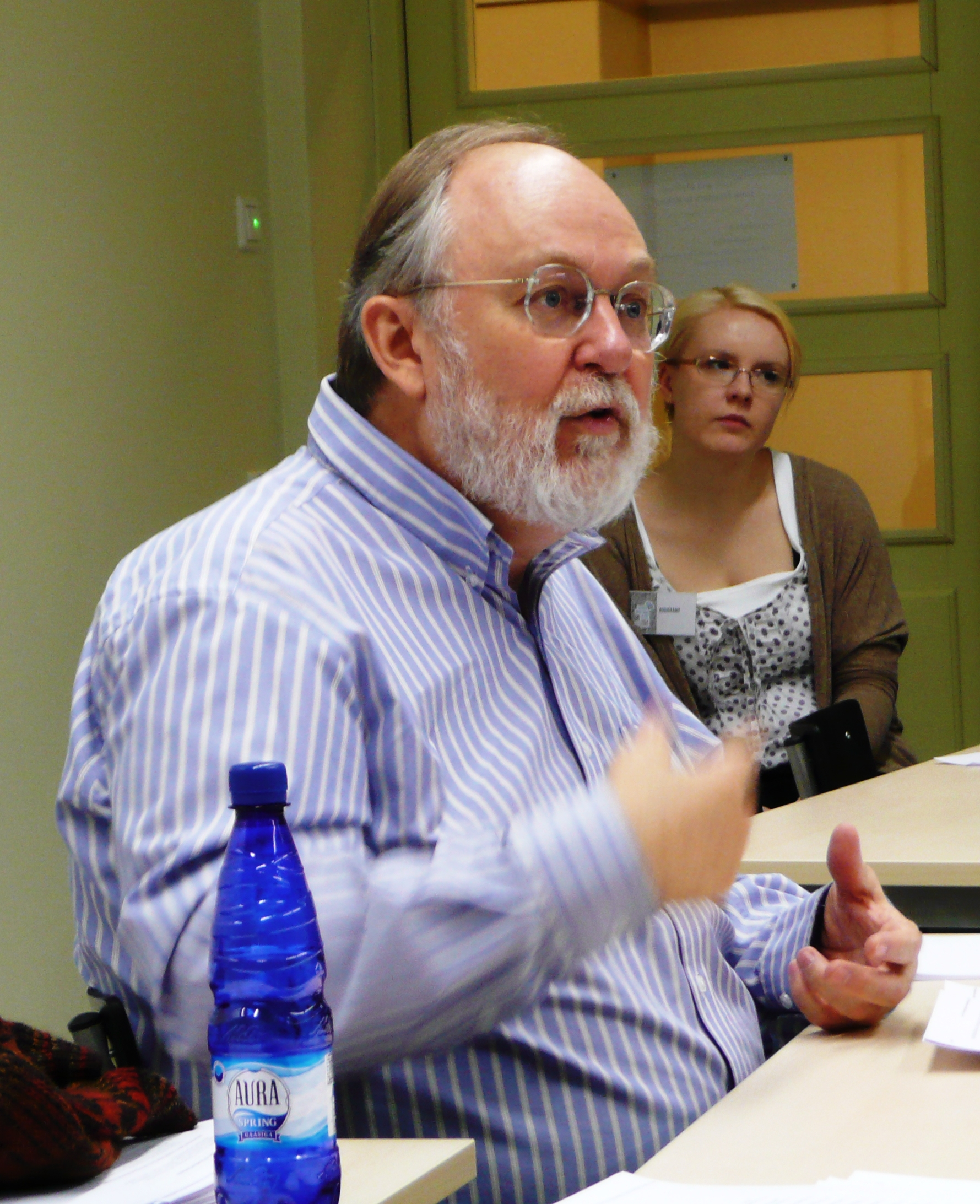
David Huron, 2013

David Huron (June 1, 1954 – June 5, 2025) was a Canadian-American Arts and Humanities Distinguished Professor at the Ohio State University, in both the School of Music and the Center for Cognitive and Brain Sciences. His teaching and publications focus on the psychology of music and music cognition. In 2017, Huron was awarded the Society for Music Perception and Cognition Achievement Award., followed in 2019 by the Society for Music Theory's Lifetime Membership Award. In 2021 he was named Nico Frijda Honorary Chair in Cognitive Science, awarded by the Amsterdam Brain and Cognition Center and the Institute for Interdisciplinary Studies, University of Amsterdam.

Huron's publications have focused on the evolutionary function of music, computational musicology, and Music and emotion. He is the creator of The Humdrum Toolkit for Computational Musicology.

== Early life and education ==
David Huron was born in Peace River, Alberta, Canada. He attended the Canterbury High School (Ottawa) and later studied at The Royal Conservatory of Music in Toronto. He then studied the History of Ideas at the University of Waterloo. After completing a master's degree at York University in Toronto, he completed his PhD at the University of Nottingham in 1989.

== Career ==
Huron began his teaching career at the University of Waterloo and moved to Ohio State in 1998 as a Professor of Music Theory and Cognitive Science. Huron's 2001 article "Tone and Voice: A Derivation of the Rules of Voice-Leading from Perceptual Principles" was awarded the Society for Music Theory's Outstanding Publication Award, and his 2006 book Sweet Anticipation: Music and the Psychology of Expectation was awarded the society's Wallace Berry Award.

== Books ==
- Huron, D. (2024). The Science of Sadness: A New Understanding of Emotion. MIT Press.
- Huron, D. (2016). Voice Leading: The Science behind a Musical Art. MIT Press.
- Huron, D. (2006). Sweet Anticipation: Music and the Psychology of Expectation. Cambridge, Massachusetts: MIT Press.
- Huron, D. (1999). Music Research Using Humdrum: A User's Guide. Stanford, California: Center for Computer Assisted Research in the Humanities.
- Huron, D. (1995). The Humdrum Toolkit: Reference Manual. Menlo Park, California: Center for Computer Assisted Research in the Humanities.

== Videos ==
- https://vimeo.com/user8725919
