= Music technology =

Use of technology by musicians

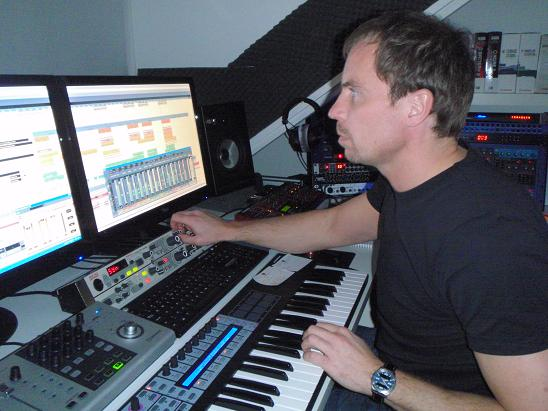
This 2009 photo shows music production using a digital audio workstation (DAW) with multi-monitor setup.

Music technology is the study or the use of any device, mechanism, machine or tool by a musician or composer to make or perform music; to compose, notate, playback or record songs or pieces; or to analyze or edit music.

== History ==
The earliest known applications of technology to music was prehistoric peoples' use of a tool to hand-drill holes in bones to make simple flutes.

Ancient Egyptians developed stringed instruments, such as harps, lyres and lutes, which required making thin strings and some type of peg system for adjusting the pitch of the strings. Ancient Egyptians also used wind instruments such as double clarinets and percussion instruments such as cymbals.

In ancient Greece, instruments included the double-reed aulos and the lyre.

Numerous instruments are referred to in the Bible, including the cornu, pipe, lyre, harp, and bagpipe. During Biblical times, the cornu, flute, horn, pipe organ, pipe, and trumpet were also used.

During the Middle Ages, music notation was used to create a written record of the notes of plainchant melodies.

During the Renaissance music era (c. 1400–1600), the printing press was invented, allowing for sheet music to be mass-produced (previously having been hand-copied). This helped to spread musical styles more quickly and across a larger area.

During the Baroque era (c. 1600–1750), technologies for keyboard instruments developed, which led to improvements in the designs of pipe organs and the harpsichord, and the development of a new keyboard instrument in approximately 1700, the piano.

In the Classical era, Beethoven added new instruments to the orchestra such as the piccolo, contrabassoon, trombones, and untuned percussion in his Ninth Symphony.

During the Romantic music era (c. 1810–1900), one of the key ways that new compositions became known to the public was by the sales of sheet music, which amateur music lovers would perform at home on their piano or other instruments. In the 19th century, new instruments such as saxophones, euphoniums, Wagner tubas, and cornets were added to the orchestra.

Around the turn of the 20th century, with the invention and popularization of the gramophone record (commercialized in 1892), and radio broadcasting (starting on a commercial basis ca. 1919–1920), there was a vast increase in music listening, and it was easier to distribute music to a wider public.

The development of sound recording had a major influence on the development of popular music genres because it enabled recordings of songs and bands to be widely distributed. The invention of sound recording also gave rise to a new subgenre of classical music: the Musique concrete style of electronic composition.

The invention of multitrack recording enabled pop bands to overdub many layers of instrument tracks and vocals, creating new sounds that would not be possible in a live performance.

In the early 20th century, electric technologies such as electromagnetic pickups, amplifiers and loudspeakers were used to develop new electric instruments such as the electric piano (1929), electric guitar (1931), electro-mechanical organ (1934) and electric bass (1935). The 20th-century orchestra gained new instruments and new sounds. Some orchestra pieces used the electric guitar, electric bass or the Theremin.

The invention of the miniature transistor in 1947 enabled the creation of a new generation of synthesizers, which were used first in pop music in the 1960s. Unlike prior keyboard instrument technologies, synthesizer keyboards do not have strings, pipes, or metal tines. A synthesizer keyboard creates musical sounds using electronic circuitry, or, later, computer chips and software. Synthesizers became popular in the mass market in the early 1980s.

With the development of powerful microchips, a number of new electronic or digital music technologies were introduced in the 1980s and subsequent decades, including drum machines and music sequencers. Electronic and digital music technologies are any device, such as a computer, an electronic effects unit or software, that is used by a musician or composer to help make or perform music. The term usually refers to the use of electronic devices, computer hardware and computer software that is used in the performance, playback, composition, sound recording and reproduction, mixing, analysis and editing of music.

== Mechanical technologies ==
=== Prehistoric eras ===
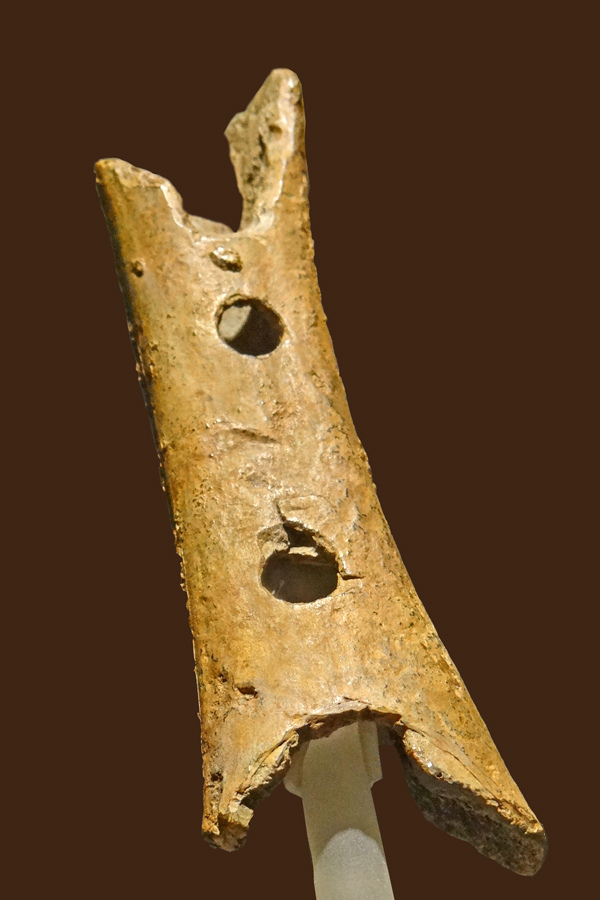
A bone flute which is over 41,000 years old

Findings from paleolithic archaeology sites suggest that prehistoric people used carving and piercing tools to create instruments. Archeologists have found Paleolithic flutes carved from bones in which lateral holes have been pierced. The disputed Divje Babe flute, a perforated cave bear femur, is at least 40,000 years old. Instruments such as the seven-holed flute and various types of stringed instruments, such as the Ravanahatha, have been recovered from the Indus Valley civilization archaeological sites. India has one of the oldest musical traditions in the world—references to Indian classical music (marga) are found in the Vedas, ancient scriptures of the Hindu tradition. The earliest and largest collection of prehistoric musical instruments was found in China and dates back to between 7000 and 6600 BC.

=== Ancient Egypt ===
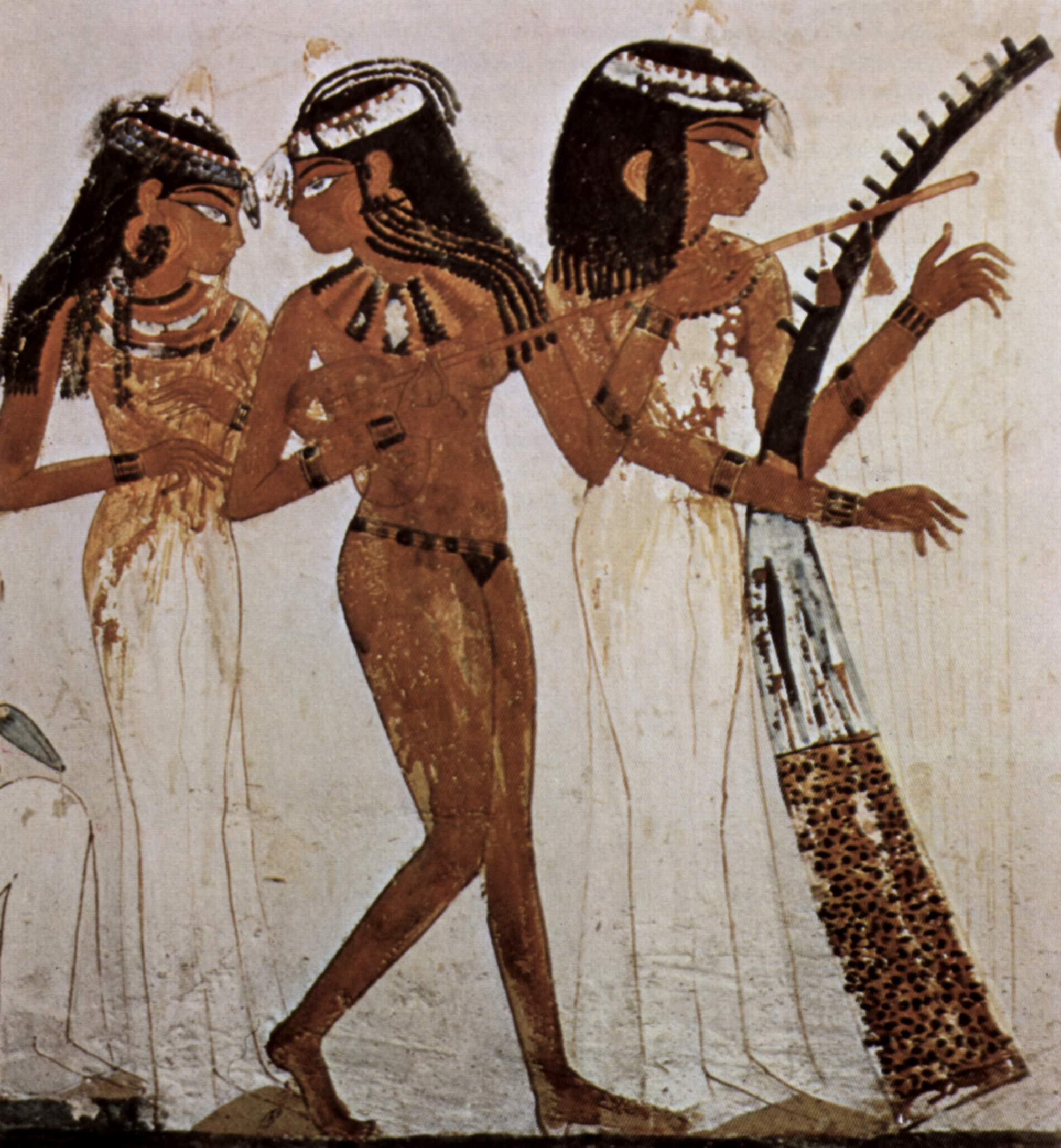
Musicians of Amun, 18th Dynasty (c. 1543–1292 BC)

In prehistoric Egypt, music and chanting were commonly used in magic and rituals, and small shells were used as whistles. Evidence of Egyptian musical instruments dates to the Predynastic period, when funerary chants played an important role in Egyptian religion and were accompanied by clappers and possibly the flute. The most reliable evidence of instrument technologies dates from the Old Kingdom, when technologies for constructing harps, flutes and double clarinets were developed. Percussion instruments, lyres and lutes were used by the Middle Kingdom. Metal cymbals were used by ancient Egyptians. In the early 21st century, interest in the music of the pharaonic period began to grow, inspired by the research of such foreign-born musicologists as Hans Hickmann. By the early 21st century, Egyptian musicians and musicologists led by the musicology professor Khairy El-Malt at Helwan University in Cairo had begun to reconstruct musical instruments of ancient Egypt, a project that is ongoing.

=== Indus Valley ===
The Indus Valley civilization has sculptures that show old musical instruments, like the seven-holed flute. Various types of stringed instruments and drums have been recovered from Harappa and Mohenjo Daro by excavations carried out by Sir Mortimer Wheeler.

=== References in the Bible ===
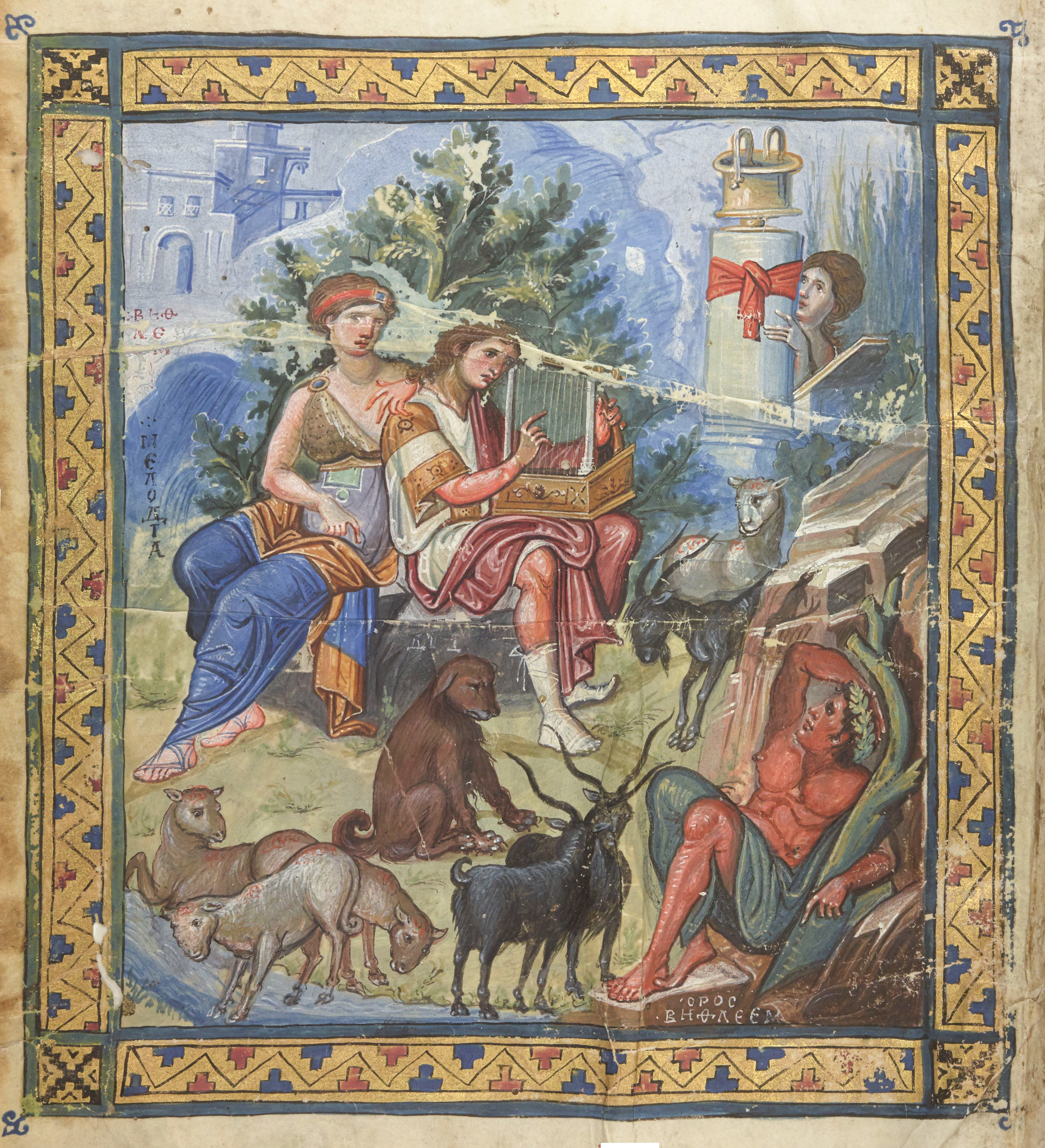
"David with his harp", from the Paris Psalter, c. 960, Constantinople

According to the Scriptures, Jubal was the father of harpists and organists (Gen. 4:20–21). The harp was among the chief instruments and the favorite of David, and it is referred to more than fifty times in the Bible. It was used at both joyful and mournful ceremonies, and its use was "raised to its highest perfection under David" (1 Sam. 16:23). Lockyer adds that "It was the sweet music of the harp that often dispossessed Saul of his melancholy (1 Sam. 16:14–23; 18:10–11). When the Jews were captive in Babylon they hung their harps up and refused to use them while in exile, earlier being part of the instruments used in the Temple (1 Kgs. 10:12). Another stringed instrument of the harp class, and one also used by the ancient Greeks, was the lyre. A similar instrument was the lute, which had a large pear-shaped body, long neck, and fretted fingerboard with head screws for tuning. Coins displaying musical instruments, the Bar Kochba Revolt coinage, were issued by the Jews during the Second Jewish Revolt against the Roman Empire of 132–135 AD. In addition to those, there was the psaltery, another stringed instrument that is referred to almost thirty times in Scripture. According to Josephus, it had twelve strings and was played with a quill, not with the hand. Another writer suggested that it was like a guitar, but with a flat triangular form and strung from side to side.

Miriam and women celebrate the crossing of the Red Sea with "timbrels" (small hand drums) (from the Tomić Psalter).

Among the wind instruments used in the biblical period were the cornet, flute, horn, organ, pipe, and trumpet. There were also silver trumpets and the double oboe. Werner concludes that from the measurements taken of the trumpets on the Arch of Titus in Rome and from coins, that "the trumpets were very high pitched with thin body and shrill sound." He adds that in War of the Sons of Light Against the Sons of Darkness, a manual for military organization and strategy discovered among the Dead Sea Scrolls, these trumpets "appear clearly capable of regulating their pitch pretty accurately, as they are supposed to blow rather complicated signals in unison." Whitcomb writes that the pair of silver trumpets were fashioned according to Mosaic law and were probably among the trophies that the Emperor Titus brought to Rome when he conquered Jerusalem. She adds that on the Arch raised to the victorious Titus, "there is a sculptured relief of these trumpets, showing their ancient form. (see photo)

The flute was commonly used for festal and mourning occasions, according to Whitcomb. "Even the poorest Hebrew was obliged to employ two flute players to perform at his wife's funeral." The shofar (the horn of a ram) is still used for special liturgical purposes such as the Jewish New Year services in orthodox communities. As such, it is not considered a musical instrument but an instrument of theological symbolism that has been intentionally kept to its primitive character. In ancient times it was used for warning of danger, to announce the new moon or beginning of Sabbath, or to announce the death of a notable. "In its strictly ritual usage it carried the cries of the multitude to God," writes Werner.

Among the percussion instruments were bells, cymbals, sistrum, tabret, hand drums, and tambourines. The tabret, or timbrel, was a small hand drum used for festive occasions and was considered a woman's instrument. In modern times it was often used by the Salvation Army. According to the Bible, when the children of Israel came out of Egypt and crossed the Red Sea, "Miriam took a timbrel in her hands; and all the women went out after her with timbrels and with dance."

=== Ancient Greece ===
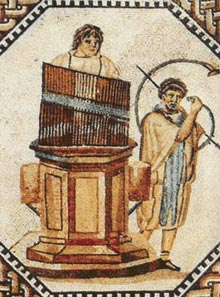
The hydraulis or "water organ". Note the curved trumpet, called the bukanē by the Greeks and, later, cornu by the Romans.

In ancient Greece, instruments in all music can be divided into three categories, based on how sound is produced: string, wind, and percussion. The following were among the instruments used in the music of ancient Greece:

- the lyre: a strummed and occasionally plucked string instrument, essentially a hand-held zither built on a tortoise-shell frame, generally with seven or more strings tuned to the notes of one of the modes. The lyre was used to accompany others or even oneself for recitation and song.
- the kithara, also a strummed string instrument, more complicated than the lyre. It had a box-type frame with strings stretched from the cross-bar at the top to the sounding box at the bottom; it was held upright and played with a plectrum. The strings were tunable by adjusting wooden wedges along the cross-bar.
- the aulos, usually double, consisting of two double-reed (like an oboe) pipes, not joined but generally played with a mouth-band to hold both pipes steadily between the player's lips. Modern reconstructions indicate that they produced a low, clarinet-like sound. There is some confusion about the exact nature of the instrument; alternate descriptions indicate single reeds instead of double reeds.
- the Pan pipes, also known as panflute and syrinx (Greek συριγξ), (so-called for the nymph who was changed into a reed in order to hide from Pan) is an ancient musical instrument based on the principle of the stopped pipe, consisting of a series of such pipes of gradually increasing length, tuned (by cutting) to a desired scale. Sound is produced by blowing across the top of the open pipe (like blowing across a bottle top).
- the hydraulis, a keyboard instrument, the forerunner of the modern organ. As the name indicates, the instrument used water to supply a constant flow of pressure to the pipes. Two detailed descriptions have survived: that of Vitruvius and Heron of Alexandria. These descriptions deal primarily with the keyboard mechanism and with the device by which the instrument was supplied with air. A well-preserved model in pottery was found at Carthage in 1885. Essentially, the air to the pipes that produce the sound comes from a wind chest connected by a pipe to a dome; air is pumped in to compress water, and the water rises in the dome, compressing the air, and causing a steady supply of air to the pipes.

In the Aeneid, Virgil makes numerous references to the trumpet. The lyre, kithara, aulos, hydraulis (water organ) and trumpet all found their way into the music of ancient Rome.

=== Roman Empire ===
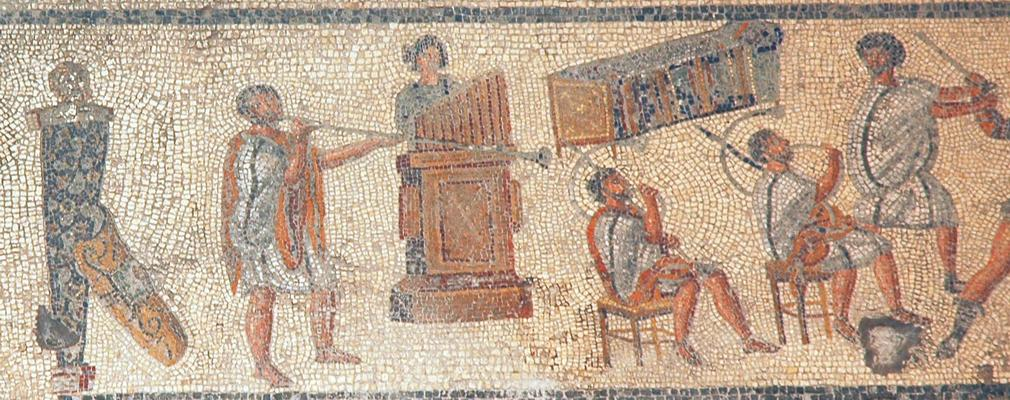
Musicians in a detail from the Zliten mosaic (2nd century AD), originally shown as accompanying gladiator combat and wild-animal events in the arena: from left, the tuba, hydraulis (water pipe organ), and two cornua

The Romans may have borrowed the Greek method of enchiriadic notation to record their music if they used any notation at all. Four letters (in English notation 'A', 'G', 'F' and 'C') indicated a series of four succeeding tones. Rhythm signs, written above the letters, indicated the duration of each note. Roman art depicts various woodwinds, "brass", percussion and stringed instruments. Roman-style instruments are found in parts of the Empire where they did not originate and indicate that music was among the aspects of Roman culture that spread throughout the provinces.

Roman instruments include:

- The Roman tuba was a long, straight bronze trumpet with a detachable, conical mouthpiece. Extant examples are about 1.3 metres long, and have a cylindrical bore from the mouthpiece to the point where the bell flares abruptly, similar to the modern straight trumpet seen in presentations of 'period music'. Since there were no valves, the tuba was capable only of a single overtone series. In the military, it was used for "bugle calls". The tuba is also depicted in art such as mosaics accompanying games (ludi) and spectacle events.
- The cornu (Latin "horn") was a long tubular metal wind instrument that curved around the musician's body, shaped rather like an uppercase G. It had a conical bore (again like a French horn) and a conical mouthpiece. It may be hard to distinguish from the buccina. The cornu was used for military signals and on parade. The cornicen was a military signal officer who translated orders into calls. Like the tuba, the cornu also appears as accompaniment for public events and spectacle entertainments.
- The tibia (Greek aulos – αὐλός), usually double, had two double-reed (as in a modern oboe) pipes, not joined but generally played with a mouth-band capistrum to hold both pipes steadily between the player's lips.
- The askaules — a bagpipe.
- Versions of the modern flute and panpipes.
- The lyre, borrowed from the Greeks, was not a harp, but instead had a sounding body of wood or a tortoise shell covered with skin, and arms of animal horn or wood, with strings stretched from a cross bar to the sounding body.
- The cithara was the premier musical instrument of ancient Rome and was played both in popular and elevated forms of music. Larger and heavier than a lyre, the cithara was a loud, sweet and piercing instrument with precision tuning ability.
- The lute (pandura or monochord) was known by several names among the Greeks and Romans. In construction, the lute differs from the lyre in having fewer strings stretched over a solid neck or fret-board, on which the strings can be stopped to produce graduated notes. Each lute string is thereby capable of producing a greater range of notes than a lyre string. Although long-necked lutes are depicted in art from Mesopotamia as early as 2340–2198 BC, and also occur in Egyptian iconography, the lute in the Greco-Roman world was far less common than the lyre and cithara. The lute of the medieval West is thought to owe more to the Arab oud, from which its name derives (al ʿūd).
- The hydraulic pipe organ (hydraulis), which worked by water pressure, was "one of the most significant technical and musical achievements of antiquity". Essentially, the air to the pipes that produce the sound comes from a mechanism of a wind-chest connected by a pipe to a dome; air is pumped in to compress water, and the water rises in the dome, compressing the air and causing a steady supply to reach the pipes (also see Pipe organ#History). The hydraulis accompanied gladiator contests and events in the arena, as well as stage performances.
- Variations of a hinged wooden or metal device, called a scabellum used to beat time. Also, there were various rattles, bells and tambourines.
- Drum and percussion instruments like timpani and castanets, the Egyptian sistrum, and brazen pans, served various musical and other purposes in ancient Rome, including backgrounds for rhythmic dance, celebratory rites like those of the Bacchantes and military uses.
- The sistrum was a rattle consisting of rings strung across the cross-bars of a metal frame, which was often used for ritual purposes.
- Cymbala (Lat. plural of cymbalum, from the Greek kymbalon) were small cymbals: metal discs with concave centres and turned rims, used in pairs which were clashed together.

=== Islamic world ===
A number of musical instruments later used in medieval European music were influenced by Arabic musical instruments, including the rebec (an ancestor of the violin) from the rebab and the naker from naqareh. Many European instruments have roots in earlier Eastern instruments that were adopted from the Islamic world. The Arabic rabāb, also known as the spiked fiddle, is the earliest known bowed string instrument and the ancestor of all European bowed instruments, including the rebec, the Byzantine lyra, and the violin.

The plucked and bowed versions of the rebab existed alongside each other. The bowed instruments became the rebec or rabel and the plucked instruments became the gittern. Curt Sachs linked this instrument with the mandola, the kopuz and the gambus, and named the bowed version rabâb.

The Arabic oud in Islamic music was the direct ancestor of the European lute. The oud is also cited as a precursor to the modern guitar. The guitar has roots in the four-string oud, brought to Iberia by the Moors in the 8th century. A direct ancestor of the modern guitar is the guitarra morisca (Moorish guitar), which was in use in Spain by 1200. By the 14th century, it was simply referred to as a guitar.

The origin of automatic musical instruments dates back to the 9th century when the Persian Banū Mūsā brothers invented a hydropowered organ using exchangeable cylinders with pins, and also an automatic flute playing machine using steam power. These were the earliest automated mechanical musical instruments. The Banu Musa brothers' automatic flute player was the first programmable musical device, the first music sequencer, and the first example of repetitive music technology, powered by hydraulics.

In 1206, the Arab engineer Al-Jazari invented a programmable humanoid automata band. According to Charles B. Fowler, the automata were a "robot band" which performed "more than fifty facial and body actions during each musical selection." It was also the first programmable drum machine. Among the four automaton musicians, two were drummers. It was a drum machine where pegs (cams) bumped into little levers that operated the percussion. The drummers could be made to play different rhythms and different drum patterns if the pegs were moved around.

=== Middle Ages ===
A sample of notation for the Kýrie Eléison XI (Orbis Factor), which is from the Liber Usualis, which originated in the 11th century. Listen to it interpreted.

During the medieval music era (476 to 1400) the plainchant tunes used for religious songs were primarily monophonic (a single line, unaccompanied melody). In the early centuries of the medieval era, these chants were taught and spread by oral tradition ("by ear"). The earliest Medieval music did not have any kind of notational system for writing down melodies. As Rome tried to standardize the various chants across vast distances of its empire, a form of music notation was needed to write down the melodies. Various signs written above the chant texts, called neumes were introduced. By the ninth century, it was firmly established as the primary method of musical notation. The next development in musical notation was heighted neumes, in which neumes were carefully placed at different heights in relation to each other. This allowed the neumes to give a rough indication of the size of a given interval as well as the direction.

This quickly led to one or two lines, each representing a particular note, being placed on the music with all of the neumes relating back to them. The line or lines acted as a reference point to help the singer gauge which notes were higher or lower. At first, these lines had no particular meaning and instead had a letter placed at the beginning indicating which note was represented. However, the lines indicating middle C and the F a fifth below slowly became most common. The completion of the four-line staff is usually credited to Guido d' Arezzo (c. 1000–1050), one of the most important musical theorists of the Middle Ages. The neumatic notational system, even in its fully developed state, did not clearly define any kind of rhythm for the singing of notes or playing of melodies. The development of music notation made it faster and easier to teach melodies to new people, and facilitated the spread of music over long geographic distances.

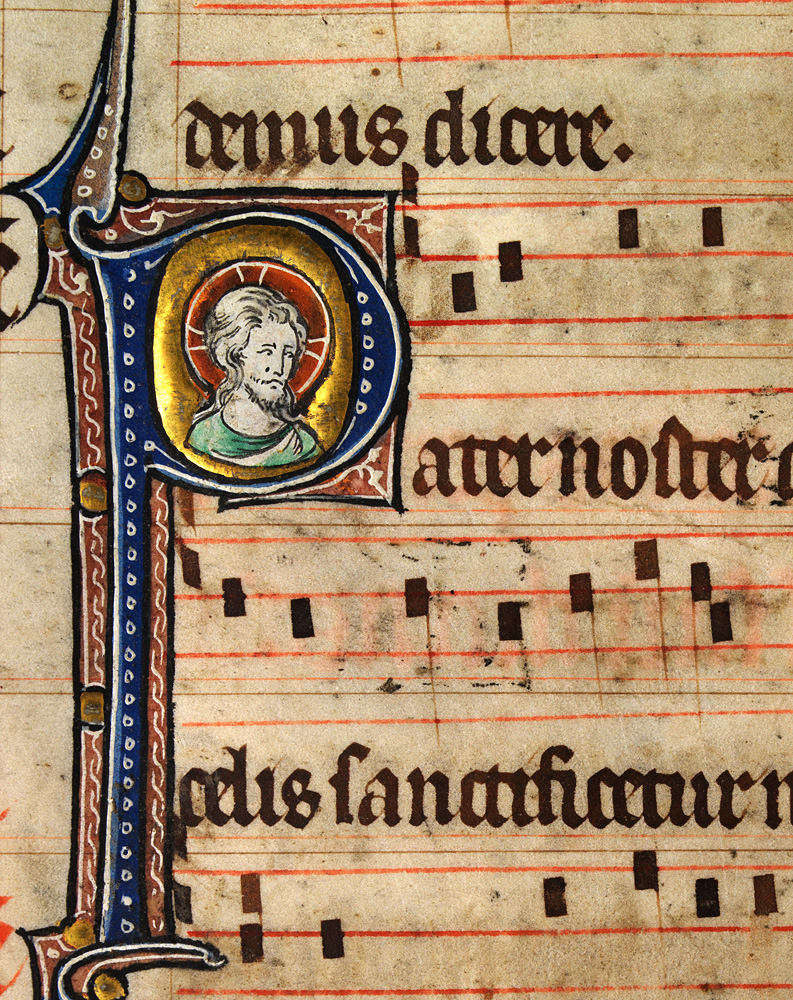
Musical notation from a Catholic Missal, c. 1310-1320

Instruments used to perform medieval music include earlier, less mechanically sophisticated versions of a number of instruments that continue to be used in the 2010s. Medieval instruments include the flute, which was made of wood and could be made as a side-blown or end-blown instrument (it lacked the complex metal keys and airtight pads of 2010s-era metal flutes); the wooden recorder and the related instrument called the gemshorn; and the pan flute (a group of air columns attached together). Medieval music used many plucked string instruments like the lute, mandore, gittern and psaltery. The dulcimers, similar in structure to the psaltery and zither, were originally plucked, but became struck by hammers in the 14th century after the arrival of new technology that made metal strings possible.

Bowed strings were used as well. The bowed lyra of the Byzantine Empire was the first recorded European bowed string instrument. The Persian geographer Ibn Khurradadhbih of the 9th century (d. 911) cited the Byzantine lyra as a bowed instrument equivalent to the Arab rabāb and typical instrument of the Byzantines along with the urghun (organ), shilyani (probably a type of harp or lyre) and the salandj (probably a bagpipe). The hurdy-gurdy was a mechanical violin using a rosined wooden wheel attached to a crank to "bow" its strings. Instruments without sound boxes like the jaw harp were also popular in the time. Early versions of the organ, fiddle (or vielle), and trombone (called the sackbut) existed in the medieval era.

=== Renaissance ===
The Renaissance music era (c. 1400 to 1600) saw the development of many new technologies that affected the performance and distribution of songs and musical pieces. Around 1450, the printing press was invented, which made printed sheet music much less expensive and easier to mass-produce (prior to the invention of the printing press, all notated music was laboriously hand-copied). The increased availability of printed sheet music helped to spread musical styles more quickly and across a larger geographic area.

Many instruments originated during the Renaissance; others were variations of, or improvements upon, instruments that had existed previously in the medieval era. Brass instruments in the Renaissance were traditionally played by professionals. Some of the more common brass instruments that were played included:

- Slide trumpet: Similar to the trombone of today except that instead of a section of the body sliding, only a small part of the body near the mouthpiece and the mouthpiece itself is stationary.
- Cornett: Made of wood and was played like the recorder, but blown like a trumpet.
- Trumpet: Early trumpets from the Renaissance era had no valves, and were limited to the tones present in the overtone series. They were also made in different sizes.
- Sackbut: A different name for the trombone, which replaced the slide trumpet by the middle of the 15th century

Stringed instruments included:

- Viol: This instrument, developed in the 15th century, commonly has six strings. It was usually played with a bow.
- Lyre: Its construction is similar to a small harp, although instead of being plucked, it is strummed with a plectrum. Its strings varied in quantity from four, seven, and ten, depending on the era. It was played with the right hand, while the left hand silenced the notes that were not desired. Newer lyres were modified to be played with a bow.
- Hurdy-gurdy: (Also known as the wheel fiddle), in which the strings are sounded by a wheel which the strings pass over. Its functionality can be compared to that of a mechanical violin, in that its bow (wheel) is turned by a crank. Its distinctive sound is mainly because of its "drone strings" which provide a constant pitch similar in their sound to that of bagpipes.
- Gittern and mandore: these instruments were used throughout Europe. Forerunners of modern instruments including the mandolin and acoustic guitar.

Percussion instruments included:

- Tambourine: The tambourine is a frame drum equipped with jingles that produce a sound when the drum is struck.
- Jew's harp: An instrument that produces sound using shapes of the mouth and attempting to pronounce different vowels with one's mouth.

Woodwind instruments included:

- Shawm: A typical shawm is keyless and is about a foot long with seven finger holes and a thumb hole. The pipes were also most commonly made of wood and many of them had carvings and decorations on them. It was the most popular double reed instrument of the Renaissance period; it was commonly used in the streets with drums and trumpets because of its brilliant, piercing, and often deafening sound. To play the shawm a person puts the entire reed in their mouth, puffs out their cheeks, and blows into the pipe whilst breathing through their nose.

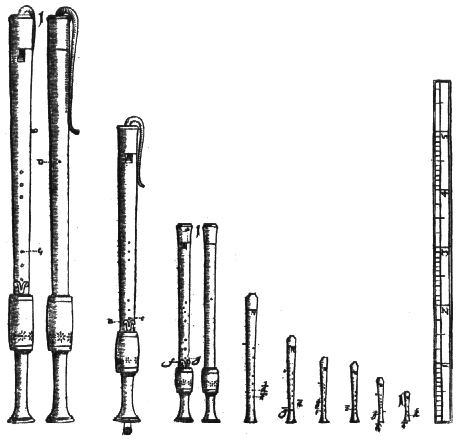
Renaissance recorders

- Reed pipe: Made from a single short length of cane with a mouthpiece, four or five finger holes, and reed fashioned from it. The reed is made by cutting out a small tongue but leaving the base attached. It is the predecessor of the saxophone and the clarinet.
- Hornpipe: Same as reed pipe but with a bell at the end.
- Bagpipe/Bladderpipe: It used a bag made out of sheep or goat skin that would provide air pressure for a pipe. When the player takes a breath, the player only needs to squeeze the bag tucked underneath their arm to continue the tone. The mouth pipe has a simple round piece of leather hinged on to the bag end of the pipe and acts like a non-return valve. The reed is located inside the long metal mouthpiece, known as a bocal.
- Panpipe: Designed to have sixteen wooden tubes with a stopper at one end and open on the other. Each tube is a different size (thereby producing a different tone), giving it a range of an octave and a half. The player can then place their lips against the desired tube and blow across it.
- Transverse flute: The transverse flute is similar to the modern flute with a mouth hole near the stoppered end and finger holes along the body. The player blows in the side and holds the flute to the right side.
- Recorder: It uses a whistle mouthpiece, which is a beak-shaped mouthpiece, as its main source of sound production. It is usually made with seven finger holes and a thumb hole.

=== Baroque ===
During the Baroque era of music (ca. 1600–1750), technologies for keyboard instruments developed, which led to improvements in the designs of pipe organs and harpsichords, and to the development of the first pianos. During the Baroque period, organ builders developed new types of pipes and reeds that created new tonal colors. Organ builders fashioned new stops that imitated various instruments, such as the viola da gamba. The Baroque period is often thought of as organ building's "golden age," as virtually every important refinement to the instrument was brought to a peak. Builders such as Arp Schnitger, Jasper Johannsen, Zacharias Hildebrandt and Gottfried Silbermann constructed instruments that displayed both exquisite craftsmanship and beautiful sound. These organs featured well-balanced mechanical key actions, giving the organist precise control over the pipe speech. Schnitger's organs featured particularly distinctive reed timbres and large Pedal and Rückpositiv divisions.

Harpsichord builders in the Southern Netherlands built instruments with two keyboards that could be used for transposition. These Flemish instruments served as the model for Baroque-era harpsichord construction in other nations. In France, the double keyboards were adapted to control different choirs of strings, making a more musically flexible instrument (e.g., the upper manual could be set to a quiet lute stop, while the lower manual could be set to a stop with multiple string choirs, for a louder sound). Instruments from the peak of the French tradition, by makers such as the Blanchet family and Pascal Taskin, are among the most widely admired of all harpsichords and are frequently used as models for the construction of modern instruments. In England, the Kirkman and Shudi firms produced sophisticated harpsichords of great power and sonority. German builders extended the sound repertoire of the instrument by adding sixteen-foot choirs, adding to the lower register and two-foot choirs, which added to the upper register.

The piano was invented during the Baroque era by the expert harpsichord maker Bartolomeo Cristofori (1655–1731) of Padua, Italy, who was employed by Ferdinando de' Medici, Grand Prince of Tuscany. Cristofori invented the piano at some point before 1700. While the clavichord allowed expressive control of volume, with harder or louder key presses creating louder sound (and vice versa) and fairly sustained notes, it was too quiet for large performances. The harpsichord produced a sufficiently loud sound, but offered little expressive control over each note. Pressing a harpsichord key harder or softer had no effect on the instrument's loudness. The piano offered the best of both, combining loudness with dynamic control. Cristofori's great success was solving, with no prior example, the fundamental mechanical problem of piano design: the hammer must strike the string, but not remain in contact with it (as a tangent remains in contact with a clavichord string) because this would damp the sound. Moreover, the hammer must return to its rest position without bouncing violently, and it must be possible to repeat the same note rapidly. Cristofori's piano action was a model for the many approaches to piano actions that followed. Cristofori's early instruments were much louder and had more sustain than the clavichord. Even though the piano was invented in 1700, the harpsichord and pipe organ continued to be widely used in orchestra and chamber music concerts until the end of the 1700s. It took time for the new piano to gain in popularity. By 1800, though, the piano generally was used in place of the harpsichord (although pipe organ continued to be used in church music such as Masses).

=== Classicism ===
During the Classical Era (1750-1820), the piano underwent tremendous changes that led to the modern form of the instrument. This revolution was in response to a preference by composers and pianists for a more powerful, sustained piano sound, and was made possible by the ongoing Industrial Revolution with resources such as high-quality steel piano wire for strings, and precision casting for the production of iron frames. Over time, the tonal range of the piano was also increased from the five octaves of Mozart's day to the 7-plus range found on modern pianos. This technological advancement of the piano was pioneered by John Broadwood and Robert Stodart, who made improvements to Bartolomeo Cristofori's previous piano escapement action. Cristofori's action was popularized by his pupils, Johannes Zumpe and Americus Backers, as the "English" action, but it was considered rudimentary despite its efficiency. So, with the improved materials of the industrial revolution, this action was refined by Robert Stodart in 1777, and then by John Broadwood in 1780, allowing the piano to produce better dynamics and sound. They quickly gained a reputation for the splendour and powerful tone of their instruments, with Broadwood constructing ones that were progressively larger, louder, and more robustly constructed.

They sent pianos to both Joseph Haydn and Ludwig van Beethoven, and were the first firm to build pianos with a range of more than five octaves: five octaves and a fifth (interval) during the 1790s, six octaves by 1810 (Beethoven used the extra notes in his later works), and seven octaves by 1820. The Viennese makers similarly followed these trends; however the two schools used different piano actions: Broadwoods were more robust, Viennese instruments were more sensitive.

Beethoven's instrumentation for orchestra added piccolo, contrabassoon, and trombones to the triumphal finale of his Symphony No. 5. A piccolo and a pair of trombones help deliver storm and sunshine in the Sixth. Beethoven's use of piccolo, contrabassoon, trombones, and untuned percussion in his Ninth Symphony expanded the sound of the orchestra.

=== Romanticism ===
During the Romantic music era (c. 1810 to 1900), one of the key ways that new compositions became known to the public was by the sales of sheet music, which amateur music lovers would perform at home on their piano or in chamber music groups, such as string quartets.

The industrial revolution also brought improvements to brass instruments. Specifically, the invention of brass valves (beginning in 1814) allowed many brass instruments to become fully chromatic, and they made their way into orchestras and other music groups. The keys on the first chromatic trumpet, the keyed trumpet, were replaced by valves. Other brass instruments followed, such as the french horn, tuba, and euphonium. Hector Berlioz was the first to use these new instruments in his Overture to Les Francs-juges in 1826. Their usage was soon followed in Fromental Halévy's Opera La Juive, premiered in 1835. Saxophones, which are not brass but are considered woodwind instruments, were also invented around the 1840s by Adolphe Sax. He desired the over-blowing aspect that woodwind instruments had which allowed them to get overtones, so it was designed using a single-reed mouthpiece. Sax applied for and received a patent for his instrument in 1846, and serious usage of his instrument began slowly over time. However, this instrument would not be widespread until long after the romantic period, as support from the classical community quickly waned, and instead gained interest from contemporary musicians in the United States during the 20th century.

The piano continued to undergo technological developments in the Romantic era, up until the 1860s. By the 1820s, the center of piano building innovation had shifted to Paris, where the Pleyel firm manufactured pianos used by Frédéric Chopin and the Érard firm manufactured those used by Franz Liszt. In 1821, Sébastien Érard invented the double escapement action, which incorporated a repetition lever (also called the balancier) that permitted repeating a note even if the key had not yet risen to its maximum vertical position. This facilitated rapid playing of repeated notes, a musical device exploited by Liszt. When the invention became public, as revised by Henri Herz, the double escapement action gradually became standard in grand pianos and is still incorporated into all grand pianos currently produced. Other improvements of the mechanism included the use of felt hammer coverings instead of layered leather or cotton. Felt, which was first introduced by Jean-Henri Pape in 1826, was a more consistent material, permitting wider dynamic ranges as hammer weights and string tension increased. The sostenuto pedal, invented in 1844 by Jean-Louis Boisselot and copied by the Steinway firm in 1874, allowed a wider range of effects.

One innovation that helped create the sound of the modern piano was the use of a strong iron frame. Also called the "plate", the iron frame sits atop the soundboard, and serves as the primary bulwark against the force of string tension that can exceed 20 tons in a modern grand. The single piece cast iron frame was patented in 1825 in Boston by Alpheus Babcock, combining the metal hitch pin plate (1821, claimed by Broadwood on behalf of Samuel Hervé) and resisting bars (Thom and Allen, 1820, but also claimed by Broadwood and Érard). The increased structural integrity of the iron frame allowed the use of thicker, tenser, and more numerous strings. In 1834, the Webster & Horsfal firm of Birmingham brought out a form of piano wire made from cast steel; according to Dolge it was "so superior to the iron wire that the English firm soon had a monopoly."

Other important advances included changes to the way the piano is strung, such as the use of a "choir" of three strings rather than two for all but the lowest notes, and the implementation of an over-strung scale, in which the strings are placed in two separate planes, each with its own bridge height. The mechanical action structure of the upright piano was invented in London, England in 1826 by Robert Wornum, and upright models became the most popular model, also amplifying the sound.

=== 20th- and 21st-century music ===
With 20th-century music, there was a vast increase in music listening, as the radio gained popularity and phonographs were used to replay and distribute music. The invention of sound recording and the ability to edit music gave rise to new subgenre of classical music, including the acousmatic and Musique concrète schools of electronic composition. Sound recording was also a major influence on the development of popular music genres, because it enabled recordings of songs and bands to be widely distributed. The introduction of the multitrack recording system had a major influence on rock music, because it could do much more than record a band's performance. Using a multitrack system, a band and their music producer could overdub many layers of instrument tracks and vocals, creating new sounds that would not be possible in a live performance.

The 20th-century orchestra was far more flexible than its predecessors. In Beethoven's and Felix Mendelssohn's time, the orchestra was composed of a fairly standard core of instruments which was very rarely modified. As time progressed, and as the Romantic period saw changes in accepted modification with composers such as Berlioz and Mahler, the 20th century saw that instrumentation could practically be hand-picked by the composer. Saxophones were used in some 20th-century orchestra scores such as Vaughan Williams' Symphonies No. 6 and 9 and William Walton's Belshazzar's Feast, and many other works as a member of the orchestral ensemble. In the 2000s, the modern orchestra became standardized with the modern instrumentation that includes a string section, woodwinds, brass instruments, percussion, piano, celeste, and even, for some 20th century or 21st-century works, electric instruments such as electric guitar, electric bass and/or electronic instruments such as the Theremin or synthesizer.

== Electric and electro-mechanical ==
Electric music technology refers to musical instruments and recording devices that use electrical circuits, which are often combined with mechanical technologies. Examples of electric musical instruments include the electro-mechanical electric piano (invented in 1929), the electric guitar (invented in 1931), the electro-mechanical Hammond organ (developed in 1934) and the electric bass (invented in 1935). None of these electric instruments produce a sound that is audible by the performer or audience in a performance setting unless they are connected to instrument amplifiers and loudspeaker cabinets, which made them sound loud enough for performers and the audience to hear. Amplifiers and loudspeakers are separate from the instrument in the case of the electric guitar (which uses a guitar amplifier), electric bass (which uses a bass amplifier) and some electric organs (which use a Leslie speaker or similar cabinet) and electric pianos. Some electric organs and electric pianos include the amplifier and speaker cabinet within the main housing for the instrument.

=== Electric piano ===
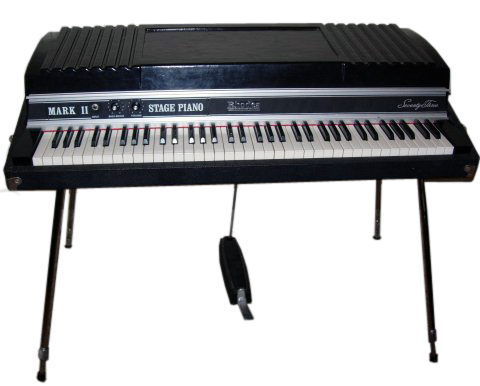
A Rhodes Mark II Stage 73 electric piano

An electric piano is an electric musical instrument which produces sounds when a performer presses the keys of the piano-style musical keyboard. Pressing keys causes mechanical hammers to strike metal strings or tines, leading to vibrations which are converted into electrical signals by magnetic pickups, which are then connected to an instrument amplifier and loudspeaker to make a sound loud enough for the performer and audience to hear. Unlike a synthesizer, the electric piano is not an electronic instrument. Instead, it is an electromechanical instrument. Some early electric pianos used lengths of wire to produce the tone, like a traditional piano. Smaller electric pianos used short slivers of steel, metal tines or short wires to produce the tone. The earliest electric pianos were invented in the late 1920s.

=== Electric guitar ===
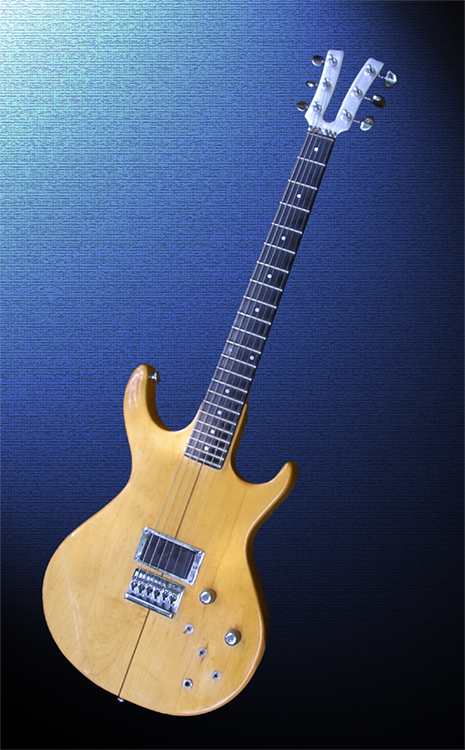
A Kramer XKG-20 electric guitar c. 1980

An electric guitar is a guitar that uses a pickup to convert the vibration of its strings into electrical impulses. The most common guitar pickup uses the principle of direct electromagnetic induction. The signal generated by an electric guitar is too weak to drive a loudspeaker, so it is amplified before being sent to a loudspeaker. The output of an electric guitar is an electric signal, and the signal can easily be altered by electronic circuits to add "color" to the sound. Often the signal is modified using electronic effects such as reverb and distortion. Invented in 1931, the electric guitar became a necessity as jazz guitarists sought to amplify their sound in the big band format.

=== Hammond organ ===
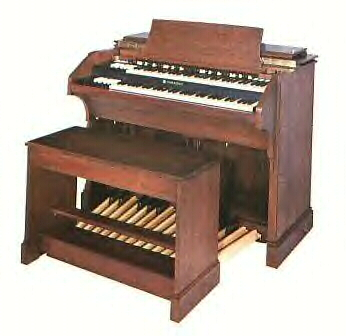
A Hammond C-3 electric organ

The Hammond organ is an electric organ, invented by Laurens Hammond and John M. Hanert and first manufactured in 1935. Various models have been produced, most of which use sliding drawbars to create a variety of sounds. Until 1975, Hammond organs generated sound by creating an electric current from rotating a metal tonewheel near an electromagnetic pickup. Around two million Hammond organs have been manufactured, and it has been described as one of the most successful organs. The organ is commonly used with, and associated with, the Leslie speaker. The organ was originally marketed and sold by the Hammond Organ Company to churches as a lower-cost alternative to the wind-driven pipe organ, or instead of a piano. It quickly became popular with professional jazz bandleaders, who found that the room-filling sound of a Hammond organ could form small bands such as organ trios which were less costly than paying an entire big band.

=== Electric bass ===
The electric bass (or bass guitar) was invented in the 1930s, but it did not become commercially successful or widely used until the 1950s. It is a stringed instrument played primarily with the fingers or thumb, by plucking, slapping, popping, strumming, tapping, thumping, or picking with a plectrum, often known as a pick. The bass guitar is similar in appearance and construction to an electric guitar, but with a longer neck and scale length, and four to six strings or courses. The electric bass usually uses metal strings and an electromagnetic pickup which senses the vibrations in the strings. Like the electric guitar, the bass guitar is plugged into an amplifier and speaker for live performances.

== Electronic or digital ==
Electronic or digital music technology is any device, such as a computer, an electronic effects unit or software, that is used by a musician or composer to help make or perform music. The term usually refers to the use of electronic devices, computer hardware and computer software that is used in the performance, composition, sound recording and reproduction, mixing, analysis and editing of music. Electronic or digital music technology is connected to both artistic and technological creativity. Musicians and music technology experts are constantly striving to devise new forms of expression through music, and they are physically creating new devices and software to enable them to do so. Although in the 2010s, the term is most commonly used in reference to modern electronic devices and computer software such as digital audio workstations and Pro Tools digital sound recording software, electronic and digital musical technologies have precursors in the electric music technologies of the early 20th century, such as the electromechanical Hammond organ, which was invented in 1929. In the 2010s, the ontological range of music technology has greatly increased, and it may now be electronic, digital, software-based or indeed even purely conceptual.

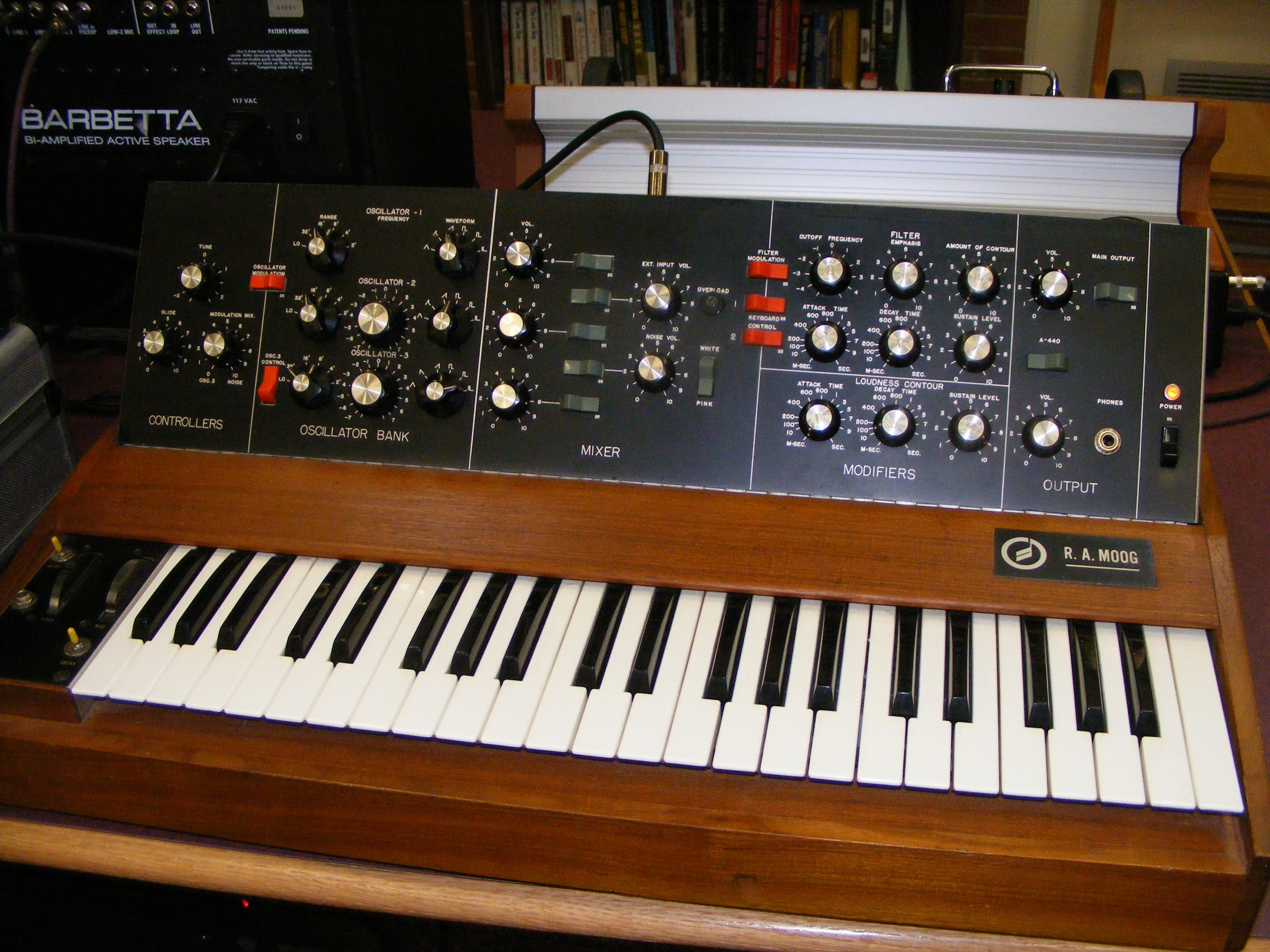
An early Minimoog synthesizer by R.A. Moog Inc. from 1970

A synthesizer is an electronic musical instrument that generates electric signals that are converted to sound through instrument amplifiers and loudspeakers or headphones. Synthesizers may either imitate existing sounds (instruments, vocal, natural sounds, etc.), or generate new electronic timbres or sounds that did not exist before. They are often played with an electronic musical keyboard, but they can be controlled via a variety of other input devices, including music sequencers, instrument controllers, fingerboards, guitar synthesizers, wind controllers, and electronic drums. Synthesizers without built-in controllers are often called sound modules, and are controlled using a controller device.
