= International Society for Music Information Retrieval =

Research organisation in music data

The International Society for Music Information Retrieval
- Founded: 2008
- Type: Non-profit organization
- Purpose: Music Information Retrieval (MIR)
- Location: Canada
- Origins: International Symposium for Music Information Retrieval
- Region served: Worldwide
- Method: Conferences, publications
- Website: www.ismir.net

The International Society for Music Information Retrieval (ISMIR) is an international forum for research on the organization of music-related data. It started as an informal group steered by an ad hoc committee in 2000 which established a yearly symposium - whence "ISMIR", which meant International Symposium on Music Information Retrieval. It was turned into a conference in 2002 while retaining the acronym. ISMIR was incorporated in Canada on July 4, 2008.

== Purpose ==
Given the tremendous growth of digital music and music metadata in recent years, methods for effectively extracting, searching, and organizing music information have received widespread interest from academia and the information and entertainment industries. The purpose of ISMIR is to provide a venue for the exchange of news, ideas, and results through the presentation of original theoretical or practical work. By bringing together researchers and developers, educators and librarians, students and professional users, all working in fields that contribute to this multidisciplinary domain, the conference also serves as a discussion forum, provides introductory and in-depth information on specific domains, and showcases current products.

As the term Music Information Retrieval (MIR) indicates, this research is motivated by the desire to provide music lovers, music professionals and music industry with robust, effective and usable methods and tools to help them locate, retrieve and experience the music they wish to have access to. MIR is a truly interdisciplinary area, involving researchers from the disciplines of musicology, cognitive science, library and information science, computer science, electrical engineering and many others.

== Annual conferences ==
Since its inception in 2000, ISMIR has been the world’s leading forum for research on the modelling, creation, searching, processing and use of musical data. Researchers across the globe meet at the annual conference conducted by the society. It is known by the same acronym as the society, ISMIR. Following is the list of conferences held by the society.

Year	Location	Date	Proceedings
ISMIR 2000	(United States) Plymouth, Massachusetts (USA)	23–25 October 2000	proceedings
ISMIR 2001	(United States) Bloomington, Indiana (USA)	15–17 October 2001	proceedings
ISMIR 2002	Paris (France)	13–17 October 2002	proceedings
ISMIR 2003	(United States) Baltimore, Maryland (USA)	26–30 October 2003	proceedings
ISMIR 2004	Barcelona (Spain)	10–15 October 2004	proceedings
ISMIR 2005	(United Kingdom) London (UK)	11–15 September 2005	proceedings
ISMIR 2006	Victoria, BC (Canada)	8–12 October 2006	proceedings
ISMIR 2007	Vienna (Austria)	23–30 September 2007	proceedings
ISMIR 2008	(United States) Philadelphia (USA)	14–18 September 2008	proceedings
ISMIR 2009	Kobe (Japan)	26–30 October 2009	proceedings
ISMIR 2010	Utrecht (The Netherlands)	9–13 August 2010	proceedings
ISMIR 2011	(United States) Miami (USA)	24–28 October 2011	proceedings
ISMIR 2012	Porto (Portugal)	8–12 October 2012	proceedings
ISMIR 2013	Curitiba (Brazil)	4–8 November 2013	proceedings
ISMIR 2014	Taipei (Taiwan)	27–31 October 2014	proceedings
ISMIR 2015	Malaga (Spain)	26–30 October 2015	proceedings
ISMIR 2016	(United States) New York City (USA)	8–12 August 2016	proceedings
ISMIR 2017	Suzhou (China)	23–27 October 2017	proceedings
ISMIR 2018	Paris (France)	23–27 September 2018	proceedings
ISMIR 2019	Delft (The Netherlands)	4-8 November 2019	proceedings
ISMIR 2020	online	12-16 October 2020	proceedings
ISMIR 2021	online	8-12 November 2021	proceedings
ISMIR 2022	Bengaluru (India)	4-8 December 2022	proceedings
ISMIR 2023	Milan (Italy)	5-9 November 2023	proceedings
ISMIR 2024	(United States) San Francisco (USA)	10-14 November 2024	proceedings
ISMIR 2025	Daejeon (South Korea)	21-25 September 2025	proceedings
ISMIR 2026	(United Arab Emirates) Abu Dhabi (UAE)	8-12 November 2026	
ISMIR 2027	(United Kingdom) London (UK)	12-16 September, 2027	

The official webpage provides up-to-date information on past and future conferences and provides access to all past websites and to the cumulative database of all papers, posters and tutorials presented at these conferences. An overview of all papers published at ISMIR can be found at DBLP.

== Research areas and topics ==
The following list gives an overview of the main research areas and topics that are within the scope of Music Information Retrieval.

=== MIR data and fundamentals ===
- music signal processing
- symbolic music processing
- metadata, linked data and semantic web
- social tags and user generated data
- natural language processing, text and web mining
- multi-modal approaches to MIR

=== Methodology ===
- methodological issues and philosophical foundations
- evaluation methodology
- corpus creation
- legal, social and ethical issues

=== Domain knowledge ===
- representation of musical knowledge and meaning
- music perception and cognition
- computational music theory
- computational musicology and ethnomusicology

=== Musical features and properties ===
- melody and motives
- harmony, chords and tonality
- rhythm, beat, tempo
- structure, segmentation and form
- timbre, instrumentation and voice
- musical style and genre
- musical affect, emotion and mood
- expression and performative aspects of music

=== Music processing ===
- sound source separation
- music transcription and annotation
- optical music recognition
- alignment, synchronization and score following
- music summarization
- music synthesis and transformation
- fingerprinting
- automatic classification
- indexing and querying
- pattern matching and detection
- similarity metrics

=== Application ===
- user behavior and modelling
- user interfaces and interaction
- digital libraries and archives
- music retrieval systems
- music recommendation and playlist generation
- music and health, well-being and therapy
- music training and education
- MIR applications in music composition, performance and production
- music and gaming
- MIR in business and marketing

== MIREX ==
The Music Information Retrieval Evaluation eXchange (MIREX) is an annual evaluation campaign for MIR algorithms, coupled to the ISMIR conference. Since it started in 2005, MIREX has fostered advancements both in specific areas of MIR and in the general understanding of how MIR systems and algorithms are to be evaluated. MIREX is to the MIR community what the Text Retrieval Conference (TREC) is to the text information retrieval community: A set of community-defined formal evaluations through which a wide variety of state-of-the-art systems, algorithms and techniques are evaluated under controlled conditions. MIREX is managed by the International Music Information Retrieval Systems Evaluation Laboratory (IMIRSEL) at the University of Illinois at Urbana-Champaign (UIUC).

== Related conferences ==
- ACM Multimedia
- International Computer Music Conference (ICMC)
- International Conference on Acoustics, Speech, and Signal Processing (ICASSP)
- International Conference on Digital Audio Effects (DAFx)
- International Conference on New Interfaces for Musical Expression (NIME)
- International Symposium on Computer Music Modeling and Retrieval (CMMR)
- Sound and Music Computing Conference (SMC)

== Related journals ==
- Computer Music Journal (CMJ)
- EURASIP Journal on Audio, Speech, and Music Processing
- IEEE/ACM Transactions on Audio, Speech, and Language Processing (TASLP)
- IEEE Transactions on Multimedia (TMM)
- Music Perception
- Journal of New Music Research (JNMR)

== See also ==
- Audio Engineering Society
- Music Technology
- Sound and Music Computing
