= Transient (acoustics) =

Type of sound

In acoustics and audio, a transient is a high amplitude, short-duration sound at the beginning of a waveform that occurs in phenomena such as musical sounds, noises or speech. Transients do not necessarily directly depend on the frequency of the tone they initiate. It contains a high degree of non-periodic components and a higher magnitude of high frequencies than the harmonic content of that sound.

Transients are more difficult to encode with many audio compression algorithms, causing pre-echo.

== See also ==
- Prefix (acoustics)
- Impulse function
- Onset (audio)
- Transient response – a common electrical engineering term that may be the source of the idea of an acoustic "transient"
