= New Interfaces for Musical Expression =

International conference

- Abbreviation: NIME
- Discipline: Electronic music

Publication details
- History: 2001–present
- Website: www.nime.org

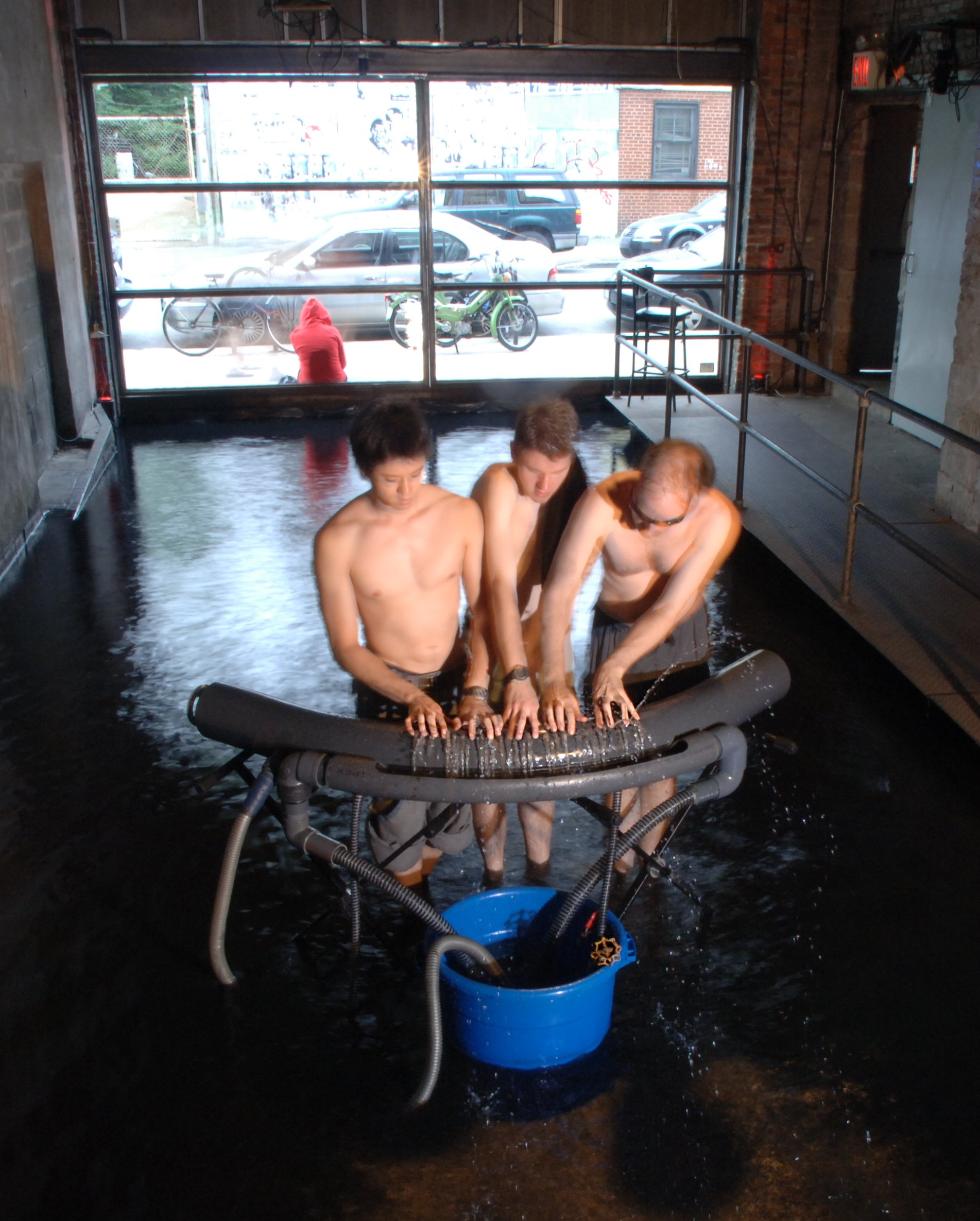
Three musicians playing hydraulophone, an instrument that is similar to a woodwind instrument but makes sound from incompressible fluid (water) rather than compressible fluid (air). Photo from concert programme of the NIME-07 conference in New York City.

New Interfaces for Musical Expression, also known as NIME, is an international conference dedicated to scientific research on the development of new technologies and their role in musical expression and artistic performance.

== History ==
The conference began as a workshop (NIME 01) at the ACM Conference on Human Factors in Computing Systems (CHI) in 2001 in Seattle, Washington, with the concert and demonstration sessions being held at the Experience Music Project museum. Since then, international conferences have been held annually around the world:

NIME Location by Year
Year	Host Institution	City	Country
2001	ACM CHI'01 and Experience Music Project	Seattle	USA
2002	Media Lab Europe	Dublin	Ireland
2003	McGill University	Montreal	Canada
2004	Shizuoka University of Art and Culture	Hamamatsu	Japan
2005	University of British Columbia	Vancouver	Canada
2006	IRCAM	Paris	France
2007	Harvestworks Digital Media Arts Center, New York University's Music Technology Program and the Interactive Telecommunications Program in the Tisch School of the Arts	New York City	USA
2008	Infomus Lab at the University of Genova	Genoa	Italy
2009	Carnegie Mellon School of Music	Pittsburgh	USA
2010	University of Technology, Sydney	Sydney	Australia
2011	University of Oslo	Oslo	Norway
2012	University of Michigan	Ann Arbor	USA
2013	Graduate School of Culture Technology at KAIST (Korea Advanced Institute of Science and Technology)	Daejeon;Seoul	South Korea
2014	Goldsmiths University	London	UK
2015	Louisiana State University	Baton Rouge	USA
2016	Griffith University	Brisbane	Australia
2017	Aalborg University	Copenhagen	Denmark
2018	Virginia Tech and the University of Virginia	Blacksburg	USA
2019	Federal University of Rio Grande do Sul	Porto Alegre	Brazil
2020	Royal Birmingham Conservatoire	virtual conference, due to COVID-19	
2021	NYU Shanghai	Shanghai; virtual	China
2022	University of Auckland	Auckland; virtual	New Zealand
2023	Monterrey Institute of Technology and Higher Education and Universidad Autónoma Metropolitana	Mexico City; virtual	Mexico

== Areas of application ==
The following is a partial list of topics covered by the NIME conference:

- Design reports on novel controllers and interfaces for musical expression
- Performance experience reports on live performance and composition using novel controllers
- Controllers for virtuosic performers, novices, education and entertainment
- Perceptual & cognitive issues in the design of musical controllers
- Movement, visual and physical expression with sonic expressivity
- Musical mapping algorithms and intelligent controllers
- Novel controllers for collaborative performance
- Interface protocols for musical control (e.g. Open Sound Control)
- Artistic, cultural, and social impact of new performance interfaces
- Real-time gestural control in musical performance
- Mapping strategies and their influence on digital musical instrument design
- Sensor and actuator technologies for musical applications
- Haptic and force feedback devices for musical control
- Real-time computing tools and interactive systems
- Pedagogical applications of new interfaces - Courses and curricula

== Other related conferences ==
Other similarly themed conferences include

- International Computer Music Conference (ICMC);
- ACM Multimedia
- Sound and music computing (SMC)

== See also ==
- Live coding
- List of electronic music festivals
- Experimental musical instrument – about several alternative instruments.
