= Seth Shostak =

American astronomer and author (born 1943)

G. Seth Shostak
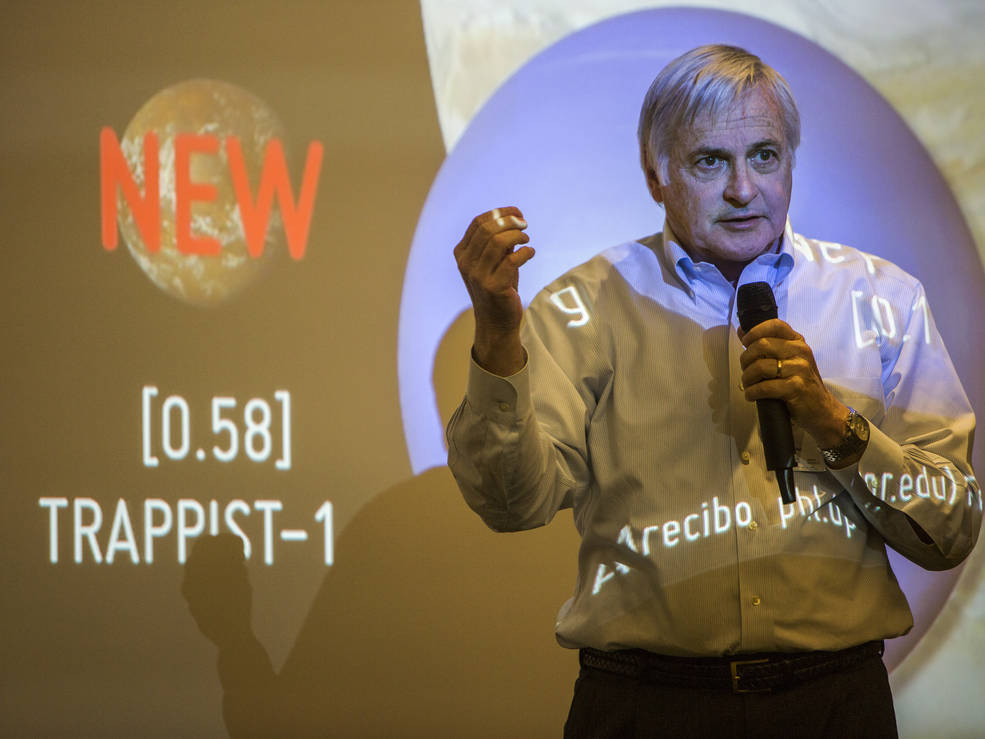
- Shostak in 2017 giving a talk at NASA's Langley Research Center
- Born: July 20, 1943 (age 83); Arlington County, Virginia, US
- Education: Princeton University (BA); California Institute of Technology (PhD)
- Known for: SETI research
- Awards: Klumpke-Roberts Award (2004); Carl Sagan Prize for Science Popularization (2015)
- Scientific career
- Fields: Physics, astronomy, science communication
- Seth Shostak's voice

G. Seth Shostak (born July 20, 1943) is an American astronomer and author, and is currently the senior astronomer for the SETI Institute.

Shostak co-hosts the weekly radio show/podcast Big Picture Science, has played himself numerous times in TV and internet film dramas, and has acted in several science fiction films.

== Early life and education ==
Seth Shostak was born in a Jewish family in Arlington County, Virginia, the son of Arthur and Bertha Shostak (née Gortenburg); his father was an electrical engineer. He earned his BS in physics from Princeton University and a PhD in astrophysics from the California Institute of Technology.

== Professional work ==
Shostak used radio telescopes in the US and the Netherlands, searching for clues to the ultimate fate of the universe by analyzing galaxy motion. In 1999, he produced twelve 30-minute lectures on audio-tape and video titled "The Search for Intelligent Life in Space" for The Teaching Company. An updated overview about the search for extraterrestrial life was presented in 2019.

=== SETI Institute ===
Since 2001, he has been the senior astronomer at the SETI Institute, a not-for-profit organization whose mission is to "explore, understand and explain the origin, nature and prevalence of life in the universe". SETI Institute, located in Mountain View, California, employs over 50 researchers that study all aspects of the search for life, its origins, the environment in which life develops, and its ultimate fate.

He was the chair of the International Academy of Astronautics SETI Permanent Committee from 2003-2012.

== Public outreach ==
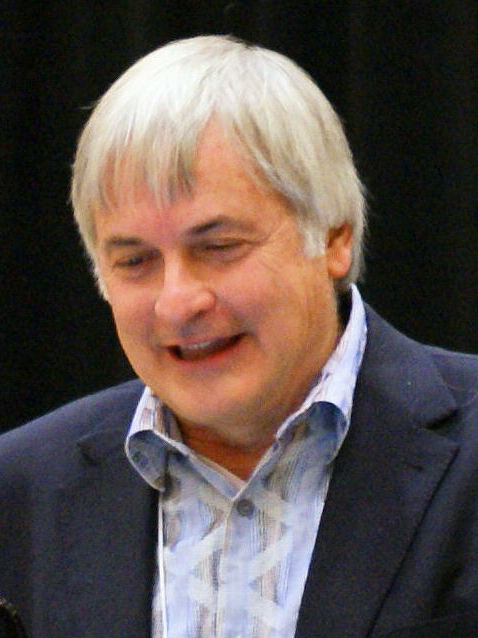
Shostak in 2011

Shostak is an active participant in the Institute's observation programs and, along with Molly Bentley, co-hosts the weekly radio show Big Picture Science, which was produced by the SETI Institute from 2002 until January 2025 when it went independent. Each week, Shostak interviews guests about the latest scientific research on a variety of topics: cosmology, physics, genetics, paleontology, evolutionary biology and astrobiology. Big Picture Science is distributed on the Public Radio Satellite System and the Public Radio Exchange and is available for download at the show's website and through podcasts.

Shostak also co-hosts the "Skeptic Check" episodes of Big Picture Science, focused on debunking pseudoscience, UFOs and practices such as astrology and dowsing.

He has published four books, nearly 300 popular articles on astronomy, technology, film and television and gives frequent talks to both young and adult audiences.

== Filmography ==
Year	Title	Role	Notes
2008	The Day the Earth Stood Still	advisor: astrobiology (crew)	A remake of the 1951 classic sci-fi film about an alien visitor and his giant robot counterpart who visit Earth.
2007	Star Trek: Of Gods and Men	Enterprise Communications Officer (actor)	Video

=== Television / web series ===
Year	Title	As	Notes
2017	How the Universe Works	Himself as Astronomer	Episode: "Strangest Alien Worlds"
2013	Alien Encounters (TV Mini-Series)	Himself as Senior Astronomer	Episode:"The Offspring"; Episode:"The Invasion"
2012-2013	Ancient Aliens (TV Series Documentary)	Himself as Senior Astronomer	Episode: "Destination Orion"; Episode:"Aliens and Cover-Ups"; Episode:"The Time Travelers"; Episode:"The NASA Connection"
2012	Science Club (TV Series)	Himself - SETI Institute	Episode:"Space"
2008-2012	Horizon (TV Series Documentary)	Himself - SETI Institute	Episode:"The Transit of Venus: A Horizon Special"; Episode:"Are We Alone in the Universe?"
2012	Prophets of Science Fiction (TV Series Documentary)	Himself	Episode:"George Lucas"
2011	Curiosity (TV series documentaries)	Himself	Episode: Alien Invasion Are We Ready"
2010	Ideas That Changed the World (TV Series Documentary)	Himself	Episode:"Communication"
2010	Lost Tapes (TV Series)	Himself - Senior Astronomer, SETI Institute	Episode:"Reptilian"
2010	Bad Universe (TV Series Documentary)	Himself	Episode:"Alien Attack!"
2010	Naked Science (TV Series Documentary)	Himself as Senior Astronomer	Episode: "Hunt for Aliens"; Episode:"Alien Contact(2004)"
2009	The Colbert Report (TV Series)	Himself (Guest) - SETI Institute	Episode:"Episode #5.70"
2007	UFO Files (TV Series Documentary)	Himself - SETI Institute	Episode:"Alien Hunters"; Episode (2005):"UFO Hunters"; Episode (2005):"The Day After Roswell"
2007	The Universe (TV Series Documentary)	Himself as Senior Astronomer	Episode:"Search for E.T."
2007	Is It Real? (TV Series Documentary)	Himself as Astronomer	Episode: "Life on Mars"
2005	Extraterrestrial (TV Movie Documentary)	Himself - SETI Institute	"SETI Institute"
2005	How William Shatner Changed the World (TV Movie Documentary)	Himself - SETI Institute	"SETI Search for Extra Terrestrial Intelligence"
1998	Life Beyond Earth (TV Movie Documentary)	Science Advisor (crew)	Written by Timothy Ferris for Public Broadcasting Service

== Recognition ==
Shostak was the 2004 winner of the Klumpke-Roberts Award of the Astronomical Society of the Pacific in recognition of his outstanding contributions to the public understanding and appreciation of astronomy.

In January 2010 he was elected as a fellow of the Committee for Skeptical Inquiry (CSI), and in October 2019 was a featured speaker at the organization's annual conference, CSICon.

He has been an observer for Project Phoenix (SETI) as well as an active participant in various international forums for SETI research. He served as chair of the International Academy of Astronautics SETI Permanent Study Group from 2002 to 2012.

Shostak has been nominated by the SETI Institute to be one of the USA Science and Engineering Festival's Nifty Fifty Speakers, who will speak about his work and career to middle and high school students in October 2010.

== Personal life ==
Seth became interested in electronics and amateur radio as a young student.

Shostak's hobbies include film making, railroading, and computer animation. While working at the University of Groningen in the Netherlands, he founded DIGIMA, a computer animation company. He is a brother of Robert Shostak, developer of the Paradox relational database.

In the spring of 1988 Seth left Groningen to help his brother, who was then working on image database software in Silicon Valley.

According to his C.V., Shostak has a considerable body of creative writing, mostly for corporate clients. He was also "idea man" behind a plan to build a large space and technology theme park in The Netherlands and also the Air and Space Exhibit at the California Science Center, where he also serves on the board.

== Bibliography ==
- Life in the Universe, Jeffrey O. Bennett, Bruce Jakosky and Seth Shostak, 2003, ISBN 0805385770.
- Sharing the Universe: Perspectives on Extraterrestrial Life, Seth Shostak, foreword by Frank Drake 1998, ISBN 0-9653774-3-1.
- Cosmic Company: The Search for Life in the Universe, Seth Shostak, Alex Barnett, 2003, ISBN 0-521-82233-5.
- Confessions of an Alien Hunter: A Scientist's Search for Extraterrestrial Intelligence, Seth Shostak, foreword by Frank Drake 2009, ISBN 1-4262-0392-6.
