= Multimedia search =

Multimedia search enables information search using queries in multiple data types including text and other multimedia formats. Multimedia search can be implemented through multimodal search interfaces, i.e., interfaces that allow to submit search queries not only as textual requests, but also through other media. We can distinguish two methodologies in multimedia search:

- Metadata search: the search is made on the layers of metadata.
- Query by example: The interaction consists in submitting a piece of information (e.g., a video, an image, or a piece of audio) for the purpose of finding similar multimedia items.

== Metadata search ==
Search is made using the layers in metadata which contain information of the content of a multimedia file. Metadata search is easier, faster and effective because instead of working with complex material, such as an audio, a video or an image, it searches using text.

There are three processes which should be done in this method:

- Summarization of media content (feature extraction). The result of feature extraction is a description.
- Filtering of media descriptions (for example, elimination of Redundancy)
- Categorization of media descriptions into classes.

== Query by example ==
In query by example, the element used to search is a multimedia content (image, audio, video). In other words, the query is a media. Often, it's used audiovisual indexing. It will be necessary to choose the criteria we are going to use for creating metadata. The process of search can be divided in three parts:

- Generate descriptors for the media which we are going to use as query and the descriptors for the media in our database.
- Compare descriptors of the query and our database’s media.
- List the media sorted by maximum coincidence.

== Multimedia search engine ==
There are two big search families, in function of the content:

- Visual search engine
- Audio search engine

=== Visual search engine ===
Inside this family we can distinguish two topics: image search and video search

- Image search: Although usually it's used simple metadata search, increasingly is being used indexing methods for making the results of users queries more accurate using query by example. For example, QR codes.
- Video search: Videos can be searched for simple metadata or by complex metadata generated by indexing. The audio contained in the videos is usually scanned by audio search engines.

=== Audio search engine ===
There are different methods of audio searching:

- Voice search engine: Allows the user to search using speech instead of text. It uses algorithms of speech recognition. An example of this technology is Google Voice Search.
- Music search engine: Although most of applications which searches music works on simple metadata (artist, name of track, album…) . There are some programs of music recognition, for example Shazam or SoundHound.

== See also ==
- Journal of Multimedia
- List of search engines
- Multimedia
- Multimedia information retrieval
- Search engine indexing
- Streaming media
- Video search engine
