= QBE =

QBE may refer to:

- QBE Insurance, a multinational insurance company
- Query by Example, devised by Moshé M. Zloof at IBM Research during the mid-1970s
- Microsoft Query by Example, derived from Zloof's original
