= Edmond A. Grin =

Swiss-American hydrogeologist (1920–2022)

- Born: January 26, 1920; Geneva, Switzerland
- Died: August 17, 2022, Los Altos, California, US
- Citizenship: Swiss American
- Occupations: Civil engineering, planetary science, hydrogeology
- Organization(s): NASA, SETI Institute
- Title: Dr.
- Spouse: Nathalie Cabrol

Edmond A. Grin (January 26, 1920 – August 17, 2022) was a Swiss American hydraulic engineer and planetary scientist, best known for his contributions to NASA’s Mars exploration missions. Alongside his wife, Nathalie Cabrol, Grin played a key role in selecting the landing site for the Spirit rover and contributed to NASA astrobiology projects, including the "Life in the Atacama" project, which tested autonomous rovers in Mars-like environments. He also co-authored several works on Mars' habitability with Cabrol, including From Habitability to Life on Mars and Lakes on Mars.

== Early life and education ==
Edmond A. Grin was born in Geneva, Switzerland, in 1920 and spent his early years in Paris, France, before his family fled to Switzerland during World War II. He studied civil engineering at the Swiss Federal Institute of Technology in Lausanne (EPFL), earning his PhD in 1947, specializing in large dam construction and hydrogeology. His academic career and professional expertise in water management and engineering laid the groundwork for an international career designing dams for irrigation and hydropower across the world.

== Career in civil engineering ==
For over three decades, Grin applied his expertise to river management and dam construction projects across various countries, including Amazonia, South Africa, South America, and Indonesia. His work focused on utilizing water resources for energy and agriculture, contributing to the construction of some of the largest dams of his time. He became an internationally recognized expert in hydrogeology, aiding in critical water management projects.

== Shift to planetary science ==
Grin's interest in planetary science began in the 1980s, after retiring from his first career in civil engineering. He returned to academia, completing multiple master's degrees in geology and mathematical geography, before focusing on Mars' geological history. In 1994, he joined NASA's Ames Research Center and became associated with the SETI Institute. His background in hydrogeology positioned him as a key figure in the study of Martian water systems, contributing to research on Mars' past habitability.

== NASA and the search for water on Mars ==
Grin was instrumental in the selection of Gusev Crater as the landing site for NASA's Spirit rover mission in 2003, a site believed to have once contained a lake. His work with NASA's Mars Exploration Rover Science Team sought to uncover the history of water on Mars, investigating its disappearance 3.5 billion years ago. In collaboration with his wife, Nathalie Cabrol, he co-led expeditions to Earth's extreme environments, such as the Atacama Desert and high-altitude lakes in the Andes, to study conditions analogous to Mars. Their research on extremophiles informed strategies for detecting life on Mars and beyond.

== Later life and legacy ==
Grin continued to work well into his 90s, contributing to NASA astrobiology projects such as the "Life in the Atacama" project, which tested autonomous rovers in Mars-like conditions. He remained an active mountaineer, summiting Licancabur Volcano at the age of 86. In addition to his scientific achievements, Grin co-authored several books on Mars' habitability, including From Habitability to Life on Mars and Lakes on Mars, with his wife, Nathalie Cabrol.

Grin became a US citizen in 2007. His legacy includes pioneering contributions to civil engineering and planetary science, as well as his relentless curiosity about life on other planets.

== Selected publications ==
- From Habitability to Life on Mars (2018), co-authored with his wife Nathalie A. Cabrol
- Lakes on Mars (2010), co-authored with Nathalie A. Cabrol
- Grin produced over 200 scientific papers on Martian hydrology and astrobiology

== Personal life ==
Grin married Nathalie Cabrol in 2000, with whom he shared his passion for science and exploration. He died peacefully in his home in Los Altos, California, in 2022, at the age of 102. He was survived by his wife and children from his first marriage.
