= Thomas Pierson =

- Born: March 22, 1950; Norman, OK
- Died: February 20, 2014 (aged 63)
- Education: University of Oklahoma; San Francisco State University
- Known for: Founder and CEO, SETI Institute

Thomas Pierson (March 22, 1950 – February 20, 2014) was founder and CEO of the SETI Institute (search for extraterrestrial intelligence), a non-profit institute conducting research in Astrobiology.

== Early life and education ==
Tom Pierson was raised and educated in the public schools of Norman, Oklahoma. He attended the University of Oklahoma where he received a bachelor's degree in business administration with dual majors in management and accounting. In 1974 he was recruited by then new Sonoma State University to lead the establishment of a University Foundation for faculty research. This effort led to several leadership roles in the California State University system-wide Auxiliary Organizations Association. and eventually to an appointment as associate director of the much larger Foundation at San Francisco State University (SFSU) where, for almost nine years, he led the research development and administration programs of the university. While at SFSU, he earned an MBA degree in 1981, writing a thesis on the effect of differing leadership styles in higher education management.

== Involvement in SETI ==
During this period at SFSU he assisted an adjunct faculty member (Professor Charles Seeger) in obtaining research funding for NASA's fledgling SETI research program (Search for Extraterrestrial Intelligence) and through this introduction met many of the early SETI researchers. At that time, a good deal of NASA's research on SETI was conducted through grants to universities, with the university personnel performing the work in NASA facilities. In 1984, encouraged by scientists such as Drs. Barney Oliver, John Billingham, and Jill Tarter, Pierson looked for a way to more efficiently use SETI funding. Later that year, an informal social gathering of SETI scientists, he presented his solution: to develop a non-profit research organization that could serve as an institutional home for scientists and engineers interested in devoting their careers to the study of life in the universe. The scientists, including Dr. Frank Drake, enthusiastically endorsed the idea.

Pierson incorporated the SETI Institute as a 501(c)(3) non-profit on November 20, 1984, and by February 1985 the Institute received its first grant for research supporting NASA's SETI Program. A few months later, the Institute received a second grant for Exobiology (later known as Astrobiology) research. From the start, Pierson encouraged the addition of all research and science education projects related to “life in the universe.” He made the Institute an attractive home for scientists and educators by assembling an administrative staff that provided efficient support services (purchasing, HR, accounting, etc.) with a very low overhead rate.

== Building the SETI Institute ==
As part of the original board, Pierson recruited Roger Heyns, President of the William and Flora Hewlett Foundation and former Chancellor of UC Berkeley; and Dr. Frank Drake, then Dean of the Division of Natural Sciences at UC Santa Cruz. Other directors Pierson recruited throughout the years have included Nobel Laureates Dr. Baruch Blumberg, Former Director of the NASA Astrobiology Institute and Dr. Charles Townes, Professor Emeritus of Physics at UC Berkeley.

When expansion of the institute, he pulled in scientists working on a wide range of projects including Kepler, SOFIA, and studies related to the atmospheres of Titan, Europa and Mars. Under his direction in over 28 years, the Institute administered over $275 million in funded research and on average had 60 active Ph.D. level principal investigator scientists and projects annually.

Pierson has given talks and presented a paper at scientific meetings and participated in conferences about SETI. He also encouraged social science research related to SETI and participated in a series of NASA workshops on the Cultural Aspects of SETI.

== Public and private funding ==
After cancellation of the NASA SETI program in 1993, Pierson was instrumental in helping to raise private funding to continue the SETI project. David Packard and William Hewlett of Hewlett Packard, and Gordon Moore, co-founder of Intel Corporation, and Paul Allen, co-founder of Microsoft Corporation reached into their own pockets and entrusted their funds to Pierson to save the Targeted Search portion of NASA's SETI program and move it to the SETI Institute to become Project Phoenix (SETI). Years later, Paul Allen was the primary funder ($28M) of the Allen Telescope Array. In 2012 Franklin Antonio, co-founder and Chief Scientist of Qualcomm, donated $3.5 million for updates to more than double the sensitivity of the Allen Telescope Array.

In 2006, when NASA's Astrobiology program was facing cuts, Pierson wrote an open letter with Baruch Blumberg to rally the Astrobiology community to eventually win back the support. When lack of funding forced the Allen Telescope Array into temporary hibernation in 2011, Pierson led the effort to reopen the array. Pierson also pursued joint projects and affiliations between the institute and universities. The Allen Telescope Array was built and operated with the Radio Astronomy Lab of the University of California, Berkeley. Pierson served on the oversight board for the array. He also established formal affiliations with a number of universities and organizations, the latest with the University of Southern California.

== Honors ==
Pierson was an elected member of the International Academy of Astronautics and has received numerous recognitions, including an individual NASA Public Service Medal, and the NASA Public Service Group Award given to the SETI Institute and all of its staff for excellence in carrying out research and education in the areas of life in the universe and the search for extraterrestrial intelligence. In February 2014, Pierson received NASA's Distinguished Public Service Medal, the highest award for non-agency personnel. The award recognized his"Distinguished Service to NASA and the scientific community through leadership of the SETI Institute, supporting basic research and education dealing with life in the universe."

== Professional activities – leadership roles ==
- International Advisory Board–SETI Australia Centre (1996–2002)
  Now known as S.E.T.I Research & Community Development Institute
- Board of Directors of Social Tech, Inc. (now Critical Reach ) of Burlingame, California (1995–2006)
- Board of Directors of the Molecular Research Institute of Palo Alto, California (1991–2002)
- Co-chair, SETI Committee, International Academy of Astronautics (1999–2002)
  Now integrated with the IAA Permanent Study Group
- Co-chair, SETI Permanent Study Group, International Academy of Astronautics (2002–2003)
- SETI Permanent Study Group, International Academy of Astronautics (2002–present)
- Coordinating Board of Directors, Stratospheric Observatory for Infrared Astronomy SOFIA (1997–2001)
- Advisory Council, Astronomical Society of the Pacific (1991–1998)
- Executive Committee California State University Auxiliary Organization Association (1981–1984)
