= Alan Hanjalic =

Alan Hanjalic (1971) is an engineer, professor, and Dean of the Faculty of Science at Utrecht University in the Netherlands.

Previously, he was a full professor and head of the Intelligent Systems department at Delft University of Technology.

Hanjalic studied electrical engineering at Friedrich‑Alexander University Erlangen‑Nuremberg and obtained his PhD in video indexing and search from TU Delft in 1999. He was named a Fellow of the Institute of Electrical and Electronics Engineers (IEEE) in 2016 for his contributions to multimedia information retrieval.
