= Nathalie Cabrol =

French American astrobiologist

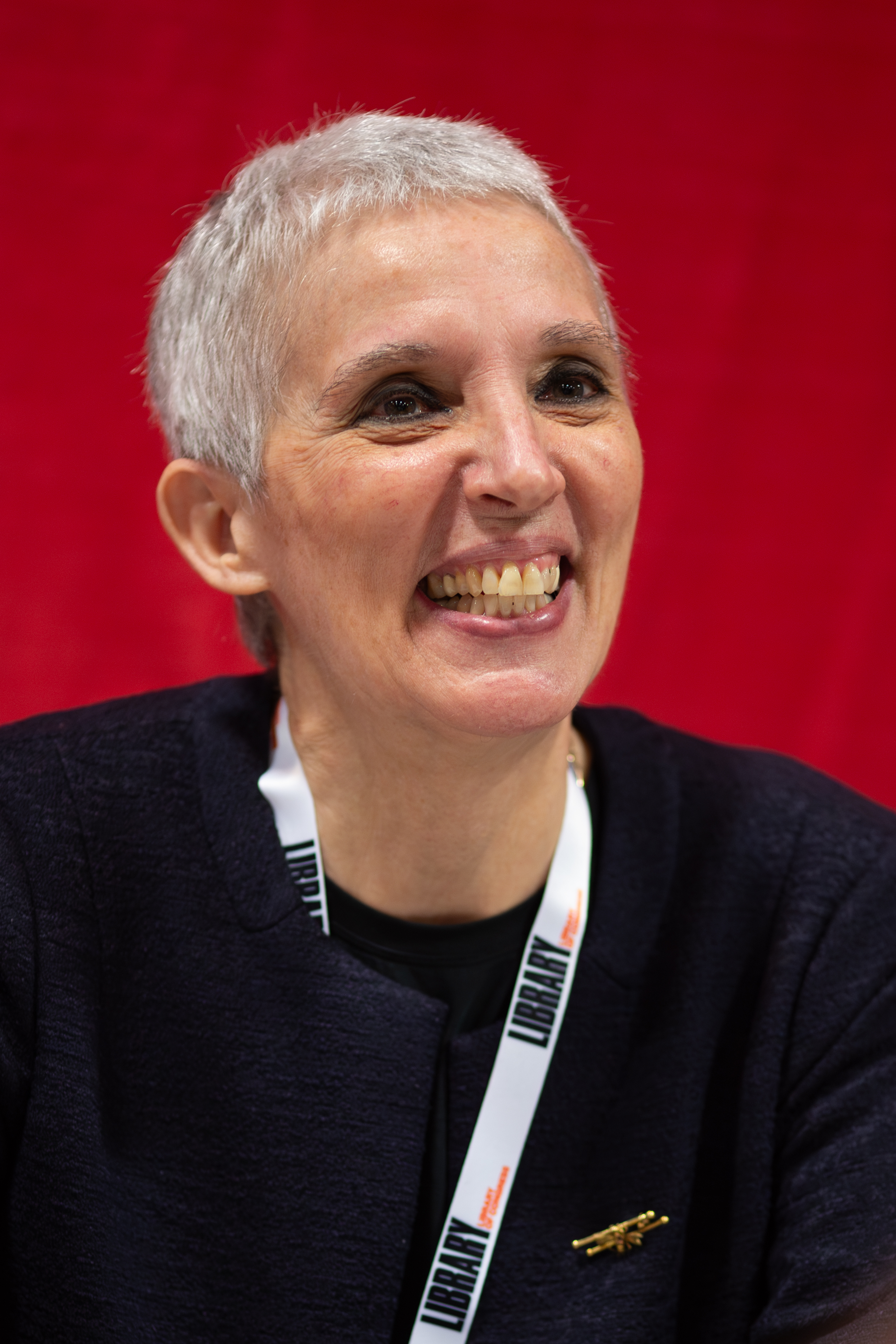
- Cabrol in 2024
- Born: August 30, 1963 (age 62); Paris, France
- Education: Sorbonne University (BA, MA, PhD 1991)
- Known for: High-altitude lake exploration in the Andes; Ancient Martian lake bed research Director of the Carl Sagan Center at SETI
- Partner: Edmond Grin
- Awards: NASA Ames Honor Award (2005); Wings WorldQuest Carey Fellow (2007)

Nathalie A. Cabrol (French pronunciation: [natali kabʁɔl]) (born August 30, 1963) is a French American astrobiologist specializing in planetary science. Cabrol studies ancient lakes on Mars, and undertakes high-altitude scientific expeditions in the Central Andes of Chile as the principal investigator of the "High Lakes Project" funded by the NASA Astrobiology Institute (NAI). There, with her team, she documents life's adaptation to extreme environments, the effect of rapid climate change on lake ecosystems and habitats, its geobiological signatures, and relevance to planetary exploration.

She is the principal investigator of the SETI Institute NAI team, which was selected in October 2014 to develop new biosignature detection and exploration strategies in support of the then-upcoming Mars 2020 mission. She was appointed in August 2015 to head the SETI Institute's Carl Sagan Center for the Study of Life in the Universe.

== Early life and career ==
Cabrol was born near Paris, France. She attended Nanterre University and the Sorbonne (master's degree; Ph.D., 1991). In 1986 she became the first person to extensively study the Gusev Crater on Mars. She attracted the interest and praise of Valery Barsukov of the Soviet Academy of Sciences, who invited her to Moscow to give a lecture.

Between 1985 and 1994 Cabrol conducted planetary geology research with her husband, Edmond A. Grin, at the Paris-Sorbonne University and Observatoire de Paris-Meudon of France. As their lab was being shut down in 1994, a visit from NASA scientist Christopher McKay resulted in Cabrol's move to the US that same year as a NASA postdoctoral researcher. She and her husband remained in the country and became US citizens. Cabrol was the spokesperson for the selection of Gusev crater as the landing location of NASA's Spirit rover on Mars. In 1998, she became a NASA contractor through the SETI Institute, continued her Mars research there and was elevated on 7 August 2015 to the director of the Carl Sagan Center.

== Lake investigation ==
Cabrol was the science principal investigator (PI) of the NASA Nomad rover field experiment (1997), and other NASA ASTEP-funded science and technology projects including Life in the Atacama (2003–2006) and Subsurface Life in the Atacama (2011–2015). She is the PI of the NASA ASTEP Planetary Lake Lander project (2011–2015) that explores the impact of ice loss on planetary lakes using technology developed for the exploration of Titan.

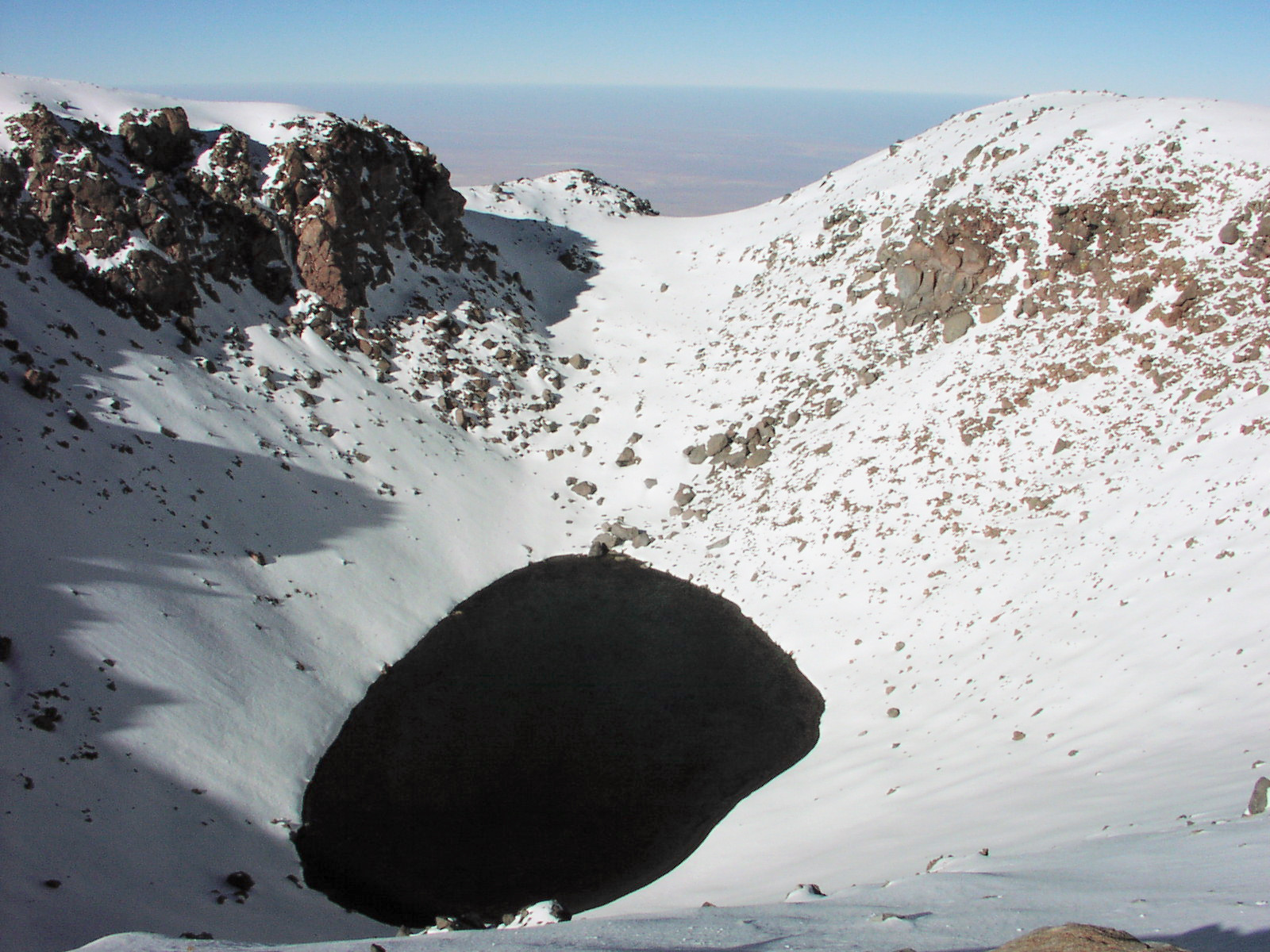
Licancabur Lake in 2004

Since January 2015, she has been the PI of the SETI Institute NASA Astrobiology Institute (NAI) team that seeks to understand the impact of rapid environmental change on habitability and biosignature potential on Mars. She explores high-altitude lakes in the Andes where environmental conditions are analogous to early Mars. With her team, she has climbed the 19,731-foot (6,014 m) Licancabur volcano on numerous occasions to conduct studies, freediving in the crater lake. Her lake exploration activities, searching for extremophiles (microbes with the ability of surviving in harsh environments) gave her the unofficial woman's record for the free diving and scuba diving conducted at the highest altitude. Cabrol found an abundance of life, including new species and a massive field of fossilized microbial mats, called stromatolites. She collected microorganisms from the lake. She recalls her "astonishment at the richness of organisms at those altitudes, despite the harsh conditions".

== Other work and affiliations ==
Cabrol is a member of NASA's Mars Exploration Rover mission. She is also a WINGS WorldQuest Carey Fellow as well as an Air and Space WINGS WorldQuest Woman of Discovery laureate in 2007.

She gave a TED talk at TED2015 on the search for microbes on Mars.

== Books and papers ==
Cabrol has written over 400 peer-reviewed articles and conference proceeding papers and several books, and is the recipient of a number of research awards. She was married to Edmond A. Grin, a hydrogeological engineer. The two have written books and papers together, including La recherche de la vie dans l'univers (2000), Lakes on Mars (2010) and From Habitability to Life on Mars. In 2008 alone, Cabrol produced 17 papers. In 2023 she published the book The Secret Life of the Universe.

== Influence ==
She is referenced in books such as Ken Croswell's Magnificent Mars (2003) and Tetsuya Tokano's Water on Mars and Life (2004). She was the subject of a major profile in the New York Times Sunday Magazine (March 22, 2018) by Helen Macdonald, "In Her Orbit: Nathalie Cabrol Searches the Earth for the Secrets of Life on Mars," which documented her high-altitude explorations in the Andes. This profile is also included in Helen Macdonald's collection of essays, Vesper Flights (2020).
