= Big Picture Science =

Science radio program and podcast

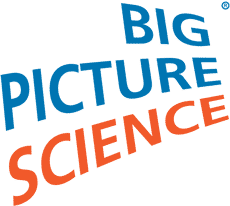
- Big Picture Science Logo
- Genre: Science
- Running time: 1 hour
- Country of origin: United States
- Language(s): English
- Syndicates: self-distributed via the Public Radio Satellite System
- Hosted by: Seth Shostak, Molly Bentley
- Executive producer(s): Molly Bentley
- Edited by: Molly Bentley, Seth Shostak, Gary Niederhoff
- Recording studio: Oakland, California
- Original release: 2002
- Audio format: mp3, wav
- Website: bigpicturescience.org
- Podcast: bigpicturescience.org/listening_options

Big Picture Science is an independent national science radio program and podcast hosted by astronomer Seth Shostak and journalist Molly Bentley, the executive producer of the show.

The program uses innovative storytelling to connect trends in contemporary research and technology. Episodes are thematic, providing in-depth discussion of the latest developments in science. Guests include researchers from academic, public and private spheres, popular science writers, cultural critics, engineers, and ethicists focused on science. Regular "Skeptic Check," episodes are devoted to critical thinking and take on topics in junk science and the paranormal.

The show is broadcast on approximately 155 radio stations, many of them NPR affiliates. These include KALW in San Francisco, WCMU-FM in Michigan, WVPE in Indiana, WHRV in Virginia, WIEC in Wisconsin, and WNYE in New York City. It is carried on about two dozen Native American stations. The show is also available for download via podcast and direct download from podcast networks as well as the show's website where archived shows from 2006 on can also be found. Episodes are cut to an NPR clock.

Big Picture Science was formerly titled Are We Alone? and was produced at the SETI Institute until January 2025 when the show went independent. It is distributed through the Public Radio Satellite System and Public Radio Exchange.
