= Data retrieval =

Way to obtain data from a database

Data retrieval means obtaining data from a database management system (DBMS), like for example an object-oriented database (ODBMS). In this case, it is considered that data is represented in a structured way, and there is no ambiguity in data.

In order to retrieve the desired data the user presents a set of criteria by a query. Then the database management system selects the demanded data from the database. The retrieved data may be stored in a file, printed, or viewed on the screen.

A query language, like for example Structured Query Language (SQL), is used to prepare the queries. SQL is an American National Standards Institute (ANSI) standardized query language developed specifically to write database queries. Each database management system may have its own language, but most are relational.

== How the data is presented ==
Reports and queries are the two primary forms of the retrieved data from a database. There are some overlaps between them, but queries generally select a relatively small portion of the database, while reports show larger amounts of data. Queries also present the data in a standard format and usually display it on the monitor; whereas reports allow formatting of the output however you like and is normally printed.

Reports are designed using a report generator built into the database management system.

== See also ==
- Database model
- Data maintenance
- Relational database
- Query by Example, a database query language devised in the mid-1970s
