= International Journal of Multimedia Information Retrieval =

- Discipline: Multimedia information retrieval
- Language: English
- Edited by: Michael S. Lew

Publication details
- History: 2012-present
- Publisher: Springer Science+Business Media
- Frequency: Quarterly

Standard abbreviations
- ISO 4: Int. J. Multimed. Inf. Retr.

Indexing
- ISSN: 2192-6611 (print); 2192-662X (web)
- OCLC no.: 843747807

Links
- Journal homepage; Online archive

The International Journal of Multimedia Information Retrieval is a quarterly peer-reviewed scientific journal published by Springer Science+Business Media covering all aspects of multimedia information retrieval. It was established in 2012 and the editor-in-chief is Michael Lew (University of Leiden).

== Indexing and abstracting ==
The journal is abstracted and indexed in Science Citation Index Expanded (Impact Factor 5.6, 2022), Inspec, ProQuest databases, and Scopus.
