= Michael Lew =

Dutch scientist (born 1965)

Michael S. Lew (born 19 April 1965) is a scientist in multimedia information search and retrieval at Leiden University, Netherlands. He has published over a dozen books and 150 scientific articles in the areas of content based image retrieval, computer vision, and deep learning. Notably, he had the most cited paper in the ACM Transactions on Multimedia, one of the top 10 most cited articles in the history (out of more than 14,000 articles) of the ACM SIGMM, and the most cited article from the ACM International Conference on Multimedia Information Retrieval in 2008 and also in 2010. He was the opening keynote speaker for the 9th International Conference on Visual Information Systems, the Editor-in-Chief of the International Journal of Multimedia Information Retrieval (Springer), the co-founder of influential conferences such as the International Conference on Image and Video Retrieval (which became the ACM International Conference on Multimedia Retrieval), and the IEEE Workshop on Human Computer Interaction. He was also a founding member of the international advisory committee for the TRECVID video retrieval evaluation project, chair of the steering committee for the ACM International Conference on Multimedia Retrieval and a member of the ACM SIGMM Executive Committee (the highest board of the SIGMM). In addition, his work on convolutional fusion networks in deep learning won the best paper award at the 23rd International Conference on Multimedia Modeling. His work is frequently cited in both scientific and popular news sources.

== Published works ==
Books by Michael Lew include:

- Principles of Visual Information Retrieval, Springer-Verlag, London, 2001.
- Robust Computer Vision, Kluwer, London, 2003.
- Computer Vision in Human Computer Interaction, Springer-Verlag, London, 2006.

Representative Papers by Michael Lew include:

- Learning and Feature Selection in Stereo Matching, Michael Lew, et al., IEEE Transactions on Pattern Analysis and Machine Intelligence, pp. 869–881, 1994.
- Toward Improved Ranking Metrics, Michael Lew, et al., IEEE Transactions on Pattern Analysis and Machine Intelligence, pp. 1132–1143, 2000.
- Next Generation Web Searches for Visual Content, Michael Lew, IEEE Computer, pp. 46–53, 2000.
- Content-based Multimedia Information Retrieval: State of the Art and Challenges, Michael Lew, et al., ACM Transactions on Multimedia Computing, Communications, and Applications, pp. 1–19, 2006.
