= Janice Bishop =

Planetary scientist

Janice L. Bishop
- Education: Brown University
- Scientific career
- Thesis: Spectroscopic analyses of chemically altered montmorillonites and applications to the soils on Mars (1994)
- Doctoral advisor: John O. Edwards

Janice Bishop is a planetary scientist known for her research into the minerals found on Mars.

== Education and career ==
In 1988, Bishop earned a B.S. in chemistry and an M.S. in Applied Earth Science from Stanford University. She earned her Ph.D. from Brown University in 1994 and then was a postdoctoral associate at the German Aerospace Center in Berlin until 1997. From 1997 to 1999 she was a fellow at the National Aeronautics Space Agency (NASA) Ames Research Center before becoming a research scientist at the SETI Institute. Starting in 2015 she joined the Science Council at the SETI Institute and is a contractor at the NASA Ames Research Center.

In 2020 she was elected a fellow of the American Geophysical Union for:

...enabling the discovery of phyllosilicates on Mars and for making critical discoveries regarding the climate history of Mars

== Research ==
Bishop uses Raman spectroscopy to examine minerals that may be found on Mars and examines minerals on Earth that serve as proxies for conditions on Mars. Through this research Bishop has analyzed water in minerals such as montmorillonite and used hyperspectral imaging to identify phyllosilicates on minerals from Earth. On Mars, Bishop's research revealed these phyllosilicates are indicative of the presence of water. In 2011, Bishop examined carbonate rocks in the Mojave Desert as an analogue for conditions that may occur on Mars and her subsequent research revealed the wide-spread presence of rocks with carbonate on Mars which could be indicative of potential life on Mars. Using data from instruments on the Curiosity rover, Bishop and colleagues found presence of glauconitic clays which only form in bodies of water that remain still for long periods of time. In 2021, Bishop determined that dark streaks on Mars, called recurring slope lineae, can be the result of the interactions of sulfates and chlorine salts that absorb water, a condition that leads to landslides.

=== Selected publications ===
- Bishop, Janice L.; Pieters, Carlé M.; Edwards, John O. (1 December 1994). "Infrared Spectroscopic Analyses on the Nature of Water in Montmorillonite". Clays and Clay Minerals. 42 (6): 702–716. Bibcode:1994CCM....42..702B. doi:10.1346/CCMN.1994.0420606. S2CID 1748775.
- Bishop, J. L.; Dobrea, E. Z. N.; McKeown, N. K.; Parente, M.; Ehlmann, B. L.; Michalski, J. R.; Milliken, R. E.; Poulet, F.; Swayze, G. A.; Mustard, J. F.; Murchie, S. L.; Bibring, J.-P. (8 August 2008). "Phyllosilicate Diversity and Past Aqueous Activity Revealed at Mawrth Vallis, Mars". Science. 321 (5890): 830–833. Bibcode:2008Sci...321..830B. doi:10.1126/science.1159699. PMC 7007808. PMID 18687963.
- Bishop, J. L.; Lane, M. D.; Dyar, M. D.; Brown, A. J. (March 2008). "Reflectance and emission spectroscopy study of four groups of phyllosilicates: smectites, kaolinite-serpentines, chlorites and micas". Clay Minerals. 43 (1): 35–54. Bibcode:2008ClMin..43...35B. doi:10.1180/claymin.2008.043.1.03. S2CID 97373731.
- Bishop, J. L.; Yeşilbaş, M.; Hinman, N. W.; Burton, Z. F. M.; Englert, P. A. J.; Toner, J. D.; McEwen, A. S.; Gulick, V. C.; Gibson, E. K.; Koeberl, C. (February 2021). "Martian subsurface cryosalt expansion and collapse as trigger for landslides". Science Advances. 7 (6) eabe4459. Bibcode:2021SciA....7.4459B. doi:10.1126/sciadv.abe4459. PMC 7857681. PMID 33536216.

== Awards and honors ==
- Kavli Fellow (2008)
- Helmholtz International Fellow Award (2013)
- Marion L. and Chrystie M. Jackson Mid-Career Clay Scientist Award, The Clay Minerals Society (2016)
- Fellow, Geological Society of America (2018)
- Fellow, Mineralogical Society of America (2018)
- Fellow, American Geophysical Union (2020)
- G. K. Gilbert Award for outstanding contributions to planetary geology (2021)
