= Public Radio Satellite System =

Interconnected satellite network for delivery of public radio programming

The Public Radio Satellite System (PRSS) is the interconnected satellite-distributed network managed by NPR (National Public Radio), and used by NPR, Public Radio Exchange (PRX), and American Public Media (APM), as well as independent public radio program producers, to distribute programming via satellite to public radio stations across the United States.

The PRSS is maintained by NPR's Distribution division at their Network Operations Center (NOC), located at NPR's headquarters in Washington, D.C. A backup NOC is located at Minnesota Public Radio's facilities in St. Paul, Minnesota, in the event of a catastrophe or other situation that would occur at the main NOC's location in Washington. The NOC oversees and monitors all elements and operations of the PRSS system, from outgoing feeds from NPR, APM and PRX, and incoming feeds from member stations. The Washington NOC is also a primary entry point station in the Emergency Alert System.

== Early history ==
The PRSS first made its debut in 1979, using the then-new technology (for broadcasting) of satellite distribution. Prior to the PRSS and starting from NPR's founding in 1971, NPR and its member stations used a network of broadcast-quality leased telephone lines furnished by AT&T, which were configured in a "round-robin" loop interconnecting the major NPR member stations at the time.

Member stations invested in earth station receiving equipment to be a part of the new PRSS in the form of a grant from the Corporation for Public Broadcasting (CPB) to cover all costs with the stipulation that the radio station must be on the air for a minimum of 18 hours per day and have at least 3 full-time employees. After a period of years the stipulations would cease and the earth station would become the property of the radio station. The equipment included a receiving dish and an analog audio receiver manufactured by network hardware manufacturer Coastcom under the master contract held by Rockwell. The dish was aimed to Westar 1, the satellite used by PRSS at its debut, and later to Westar IV after the former satellite was retired in 1983. The receiver was able to tune into the several audio channels uplinked by NPR on two transponders on the satellite. The audio channels, transmitted in analog using frequency modulation, were multiplexed on each transponder using SCPC (Single Channel Per Carrier) transmission. The receivers were pre-programmed for 12 channels. There were additional channels that were available and accessible by special Coastcom receivers that were frequency agile or by the upgrade of a microchip to the existing 12 channel demodulators already installed at the radio station. The additional channels were rented out to various programming including commercial content. Later, channels 13 and 14 were for a period leased to the CMSS (the Classical Music Satellite Service), a third party produced service outside of NPR, that was available to public radio stations who paid to air the service. Each transponder was labeled on the receiver as "NPR A" and "NPR B", with a red illuminated numeric LED display of the channel number on each receiver with each channel tunable to any desired IF-based SCPC frequency.

This first generation analog PRSS system yielded about a 40 dB ratio of analog (recovered) signal to noise for each audio channel. dbx modules that were set for 3:1 were used to increase the dynamic range of the system. Typically this worked well but for some low frequencies the distortion exceeded 10 percent THD. Also the dBx modules varied in how they tracked the compressed audio so the expanded audio was not an exact representation of what was compressed at the uplink. Many of these problems were resolved when the PRSS moved to the digital-based SOSS system, mentioned later in this article.

One of the channels transmitted was a low-speed data channel that could be decoded with a leased-line telephone modem connected to the Coastcom receiver, called the DACS channel, or the Direct Access Communications System. It acted as a 1-way wire that provided NPR stations with text messages regarding programming and other information.

Select NPR member stations were provided with satellite uplink equipment to meet the mission of NPR to provide access to the satellite system by independent, 3rd parties who would enhance the programming of public radio beyond NPR's own programming as well as provide for back-hauls of news reports to be aired on NPR's news programs or feeds of promotional material and other not for broadcast or "closed circuit" content. These 15 strategically located uplinks located in regions throughout the country were also to provide revenue from use by commercial entities who would pay for NPR to transmit its programming via its satellite system. Because NPR, at the time, had the only operational satellite network that could transmit in high quality, full fidelity, stereo sound, several music based commercial programs were distributed via NPR's satellite system such as Rockline, Hollywood Live, several live concerts, and some Westwood One content. These uplinks allowed producers of program to send pre-recorded or live material to an uplink in their region instead of having to send by mail or haul it by expensive telco lines to NPR's MOTC (Main Origination Technical Center, the analog PRSS predecessor to NPR's NOC) Washington uplink. Some of the first stations to have their own uplink facilities to PRSS were KUT in Austin, Texas, and Minnesota Public Radio, both in 1980, and KUSC, Los Angeles, who provided the bulk of the commercial radio revenue uplinks, at about the same time.

== Later versions ==
=== Satellite Operations Support System (SOSS) ===
Around 1994, the 1st generation analog PRSS system was upgraded to a new system using digital audio feeds instead of analog, and automated receiver selection and tuning of feeds (using a dedicated PC).

This system was known as the SOSS, or Satellite Operations Support System. Analog feeds were discontinued, and instead uplinked digitally (but still in SCPC fashion and on 2 satellite transponders) using Musicam encoding, and received using ComStream ABR-700 digital audio satellite demodulators, which tapped off the 70 MHz IF bus of a Satellite System Corporation Model 4421 downconverter, which was in essence the main satellite receiver for the system, taking in the L-band input from the dish's LNB.

There were seven ABR-700 demodulators (or "demods") used: six for audio program feeds (each demod was referred to as "NPR A" through "NPR F"), and a seventh for reception of data only (called the Downlink Service Channel, or DSC). The DSC demod was interfaced to the SOSS PC, which ran custom control software running under OS/2 Warp. Using SCPC frequency & satellite transponder data for program feeds received from the DSC demod (which was tuned to a fixed transponder and SCPC frequency), the software would automatically tune any one of the six audio demods to whatever program feeds the station would want to receive (the 1st generation analog PRSS receivers had to be tuned manually for each feed).

DACS messaging functions were also integrated into the SOSS PC using its software and the DSC demod. The six audio demods were controlled by the SOSS PC via several RS-485 serial connections from a board installed in the PC called the ARTIC board ("A Real-Time Interface Co-Processor"), with each demod respectively equipped with a RS-485 serial control interface.

The SOSS not only provided high-quality digital audio for NPR and other program feeds, but provided automatic tuning, as well as recording control for audio servers in radio broadcast automation systems (and control for stand-alone audio recorders as well) of NPR programming feeds. The SOSS could also be configured via its control software to tune in live feeds (such as breaking news and live programs) and apply such to a dedicated demod, which could be any of the six installed.

=== ContentDepot ===
In 2007, the SOSS was retired for the newest and current system of the PRSS, the ContentDepot. The ContentDepot no longer uses linear feeds of SCPC-based digital audio bitstreams like the SOSS. Instead, it uses a dedicated TCP/IP-based one-way connection uplinked via satellite from PRSS, which is received by a storage receiver (a combination satellite data receiver & file server) manufactured by International Datacasting . Program feeds are requested and set up at a special internet-accessible web site (known as the ContentDepot Portal) that member stations can log on to, where they can subscribe to specific programs and live feeds. The subscribed programs are then delivered via satellite as a file transfer to the storage receiver in the form of MP2-encoded ACM-based WAV files, which then can be imported into a station's automation and/or playback system.

Live feeds are sent in the ContentDepot system as streaming MP2 audio, sent over the same satellite transponder, but as an IP multicast stream (as opposed to a file transfer for pre-recorded programs) which is decoded by a special streaming audio receiver (called a stream decoder) set to the IP multicast addresses assigned for live audio streams on the satellite transponder used by ContentDepot.

The newest generation of ContentDepot hardware for the PRSS, as of 2014 and also manufactured by International Datacasting, is a special version custom-manufactured for PRSS of their commercially available "Superflex Pro Audio" receiver. It combines both the stream decoder for live programming and storage receiver for pre-recorded programming in one rack-mounted system, in previous comparison to separate units for live decoding and program storage respectively with the introduction of ContentDepot.

Some components of the previous SOSS still are in use in the ContentDepot era: one of the ABR-700 demods (as well as the downconverter) is still used by NPR as a "squawk box" for verbal announcements regarding programming to NPR stations.

== Following 2026 CPB shutdown ==
In 2026, the Corporation for Public Broadcasting was dissolved, and the legal mandate guiding the PRSS expired, in accordance with the Rescissions Act of 2025. Also in that year, the Big Beautiful Bill scheduled an auction for the radio bands used by PRSS, between 2029 and 2034.

A legal agreement between CPB and NPR allocated $36 million to fund PRSS through the end of 2030 if possible. Another $47 million was donated by CPB to a new nonprofit, Public Media Infrastructure, which would open Public Radio Exchange's Dovetail podcast platform to non-subscribing public radio stations and develop Internet Protocol livestreaming technologies suitable for locations with poor Internet access.
