= SETI Institute =

Not-for-profit research organization

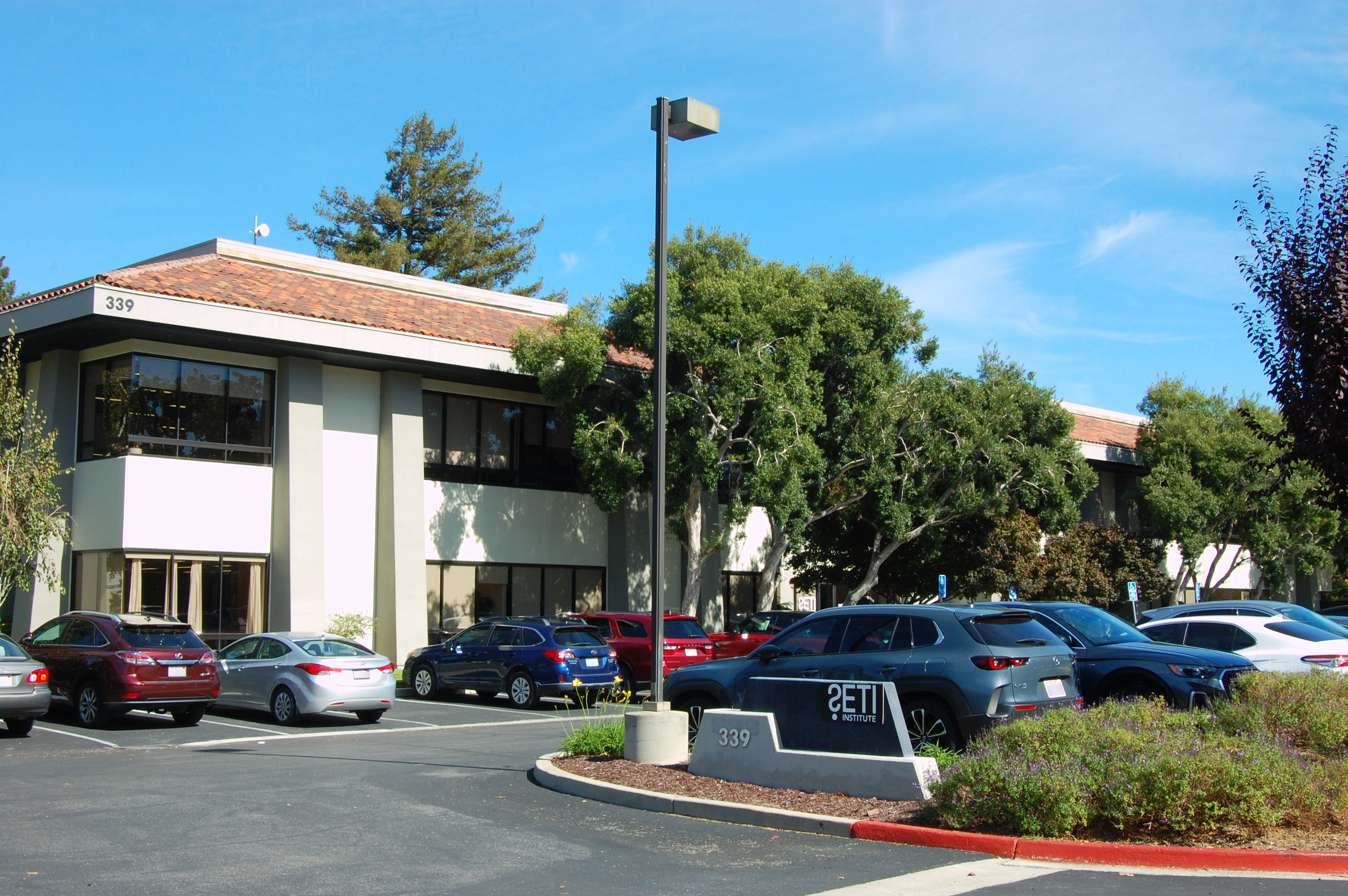
- Abbreviation: SETI
- Formation: 1984
- Type: Not-for-profit research organization
- Purpose: To explore, understand, and explain the origin and nature of life in the universe
- Headquarters: Mountain View, California
- Website: www.seti.org

The SETI Institute is a not-for-profit research organization incorporated in 1984 whose mission is to explore, understand, and explain the origin and nature of life in the universe, and to use this knowledge to inspire and guide present and future generations, sharing knowledge with the public, the press, and the government. SETI stands for the "search for extraterrestrial intelligence".

The institute consists of three primary centers: The Carl Sagan Center, devoted to the study of life in the universe; the Center for Education, focused on astronomy, astrobiology and space science for students and educators; and the Center for Public Outreach, which produced a general science radio show and podcast, "Big Picture Science", until 2025 when the show became independent, and "SETI Talks", its weekly colloquium series.

== History ==
The SETI Institute was incorporated as a 501(c)(3) California nonprofit organization in 1984 by Thomas Pierson (former CEO), and Dr. Jill Tarter. Financial and leadership support over the life of the SETI Institute has included Carl Sagan, Frank Drake, Bernard Oliver, David Packard, William Hewlett, Gordon Moore, Paul Allen, Nathan Myhrvold, Lewis Platt, and Greg Papadopoulos. Two Nobel laureates have been associated with the SETI Institute: Charles Townes, key inventor of the laser, and the late Baruch Blumberg, who developed the Hepatitis B vaccine. Within the SETI Institute, Andrew Siemion heads the SETI effort. Seth Shostak, along with journalist Molly Bentley, is the co-host of Big Picture Science, which was produced by the Institute until the show became independent in January, 2025. Dr. David Morrison was the director of the Carl Sagan Center, until August 2015, when Nathalie Cabrol was appointed as director. Edna DeVore, the director of education and public outreach beginning in 1992, retired in 2018, at which time Simon Steel became the director of outreach and Pamela Harman became the director of education, retiring in 2025. The SETI Institute is headquartered in Mountain View, California. In 2015, Silicon Valley businessman Bill Diamond was appointed as CEO.

On 13 February 2015, scientists (including David Grinspoon, Seth Shostak, and David Brin) at an annual meeting of the American Association for the Advancement of Science, discussed Active SETI and whether transmitting a message to possible intelligent extraterrestrials in the cosmos was a good idea. That same week, a statement was released, signed by many in the SETI community, that a "worldwide scientific, political and humanitarian discussion must occur before any message is sent". On 28 March 2015, a related essay was written by Seth Shostak and published in The New York Times.

In January 2019, it was reported that the institute was looking for moons around 486958 Arrokoth.

== Primary centers ==
=== Carl Sagan Center ===
The Carl Sagan Center is named in honor of Carl Sagan, former trustee of the institute, astronomer, prolific author and host of the original "Cosmos" television series. The Carl Sagan Center is home to over 80 scientists and researchers organized around six research thrusts: astronomy and astrophysics, exoplanets, planetary exploration, climate and geoscience, astrobiology and SETI. Guided by the astrobiology roadmap charted by the Drake Equation, the scientists of the Carl Sagan Center endeavor to understand the nature and proliferation of life in the universe and the transitions from physics to chemistry, chemistry to biology and biology to philosophy. Most of the research undertaken within the Carl Sagan Center is funded by grants from NASA, while SETI endeavors are funded exclusively by private philanthropy. The institute's SETI researchers use both radio and optical telescope systems to search for deliberate signals from technologically advanced extraterrestrial civilizations.

The SETI Institute employs over 100 researchers that study all aspects of the search for life, its origins, the environment in which life develops, and its ultimate fate. They include Vishal Gajjar, James De Buizer, Laurance Doyle, Peter Jenniskens, Pascal Lee, Mark R. Showalter, Franck Marchis, and Janice Bishop.

=== Center for Education ===
The Center for Education promotes STEM education through NASA and NSF-funded programs aimed at teaching and inspiring children, young adults and educators in physical sciences with emphasis on astronomy and astrobiology.

The Airborne Astronomy Ambassadors program brings research to American middle and high school teachers. Selected science educators take a crash-course in astronomy and experience two sorties on the SOFIA (Stratospheric Observatory for Infrared Astronomy) modified 747 aircraft, operated by NASA and the German Space Agency.

In 2016, the institute received a five-year grant from NASA for an institute-conceived STEM program for the Girl Scouts of the USA. In partnership with the University of Arizona, the Girl Scouts of Northern California and the Girl Scouts of the USA, the SETI Institute launched "Reaching for the Stars: NASA Science for Girl Scouts." This developed a new series of merit badges based on a STEM curriculum for girls aged 5 to 18.

Funded by the National Science Foundation, SETI Institute operates a summer internship program for college students. Research Experiences for Undergraduates (REU) is an eight-week summer internship that pairs students with institute mentor/scientists.

Bringing the Excitement of NASA Science to the Nation's Community Colleges, NASA Community College Network (NCCN) is a newly funded (2021) initiative to bring NASA subject matter experts (SME), research findings, and science resources into the nation's community college system. NCCN will expand to include Earth Science curriculum under the new moniker NCCN: Earth to Space (NCCN:ES) in 2027.

In 2024, NCCN partnered with the American Astronomical Society (AAS) to bring astronomy researchers to community colleges. The Harlow Shapley Visiting Lecture program, which dates back to the 1950's, provides support to local communities with a public talk and lectures to educational institutions. It is named after astronomer Harlow Shapley (1885-1972).

=== Center for Public Outreach ===
The Center for Public Outreach brings the work of the SETI Institute and other leading research organizations, to the general public through its weekly lecture series "SETI Talks." It produced the national radio show and podcast, Big Picture Science, until January, 2025. The program continues to be co-hosted by the institute's senior astronomer, Seth Shostak and its executive producer, journalist Molly Bentley. The award-winning general science program engages the public with modern science research through lively and intelligent storytelling and interviews with leading authors, educators and researchers in wide-ranging disciplines.

The institute's weekly colloquium series – SETI Talks, is an in-depth one-hour lecture featuring leading researchers from around the world in astronomy, astrophysics, aerospace technology, astrobiology, machine learning and more. Lectures are free of charge, open to the public and presented at Microsoft's Silicon Valley Campus in Mountain View, California. All SETI Talks are video-taped and archived on YouTube. Over 350 lectures are available on-line, and indexed on the institute's website.

== Instruments ==
Instruments used by SETI Institute scientists include the ground-based Allen Telescope Array; several ground-based optical telescopes, such as the Shane telescope at Lick Observatory, the W.M. Keck telescopes and IRTF in Hawaii; and the Very Large Telescopes in Chile. They also use space-based telescopes including the Hubble Space Telescope, the Spitzer Space Telescope, Kepler, TESS, and the Herschel Space Telescope.

SETI scientists are involved in space missions, including the New Horizons mission toward Pluto, the Cassini mission previously in orbit around Saturn, the Mars Rovers Opportunity and Curiosity, the Kepler mission, and the TESS mission. They also cooperate with NASA in the CAMS meteor-tracking network.

== Funding supporters ==
Funding for SETI Institute programs comes from a variety of sources. Contrary to popular belief, and their Form 990, no government funds are allocated for its SETI searches – these are financed entirely by private contributions. Other astrobiology research at the SETI Institute may be funded by NASA, the National Science Foundation, or other grants and donations. TeamSETI is the SETI Institute's worldwide membership and support organization.

== See also ==
- Active SETI – Attempt to send messages to intelligent extraterrestrials
- Berkeley SETI Research Center – Physics research center
- Communication with extraterrestrial intelligence – Branch of SETI
- List of astronomical societies – Overview of the world's astronomical societies
- Project Phoenix (SETI) – SETI project
- Search for extraterrestrial intelligence – Effort to find civilizations not from Earth
- SETIcon – Public conventions on the search for extraterrestrial intelligence
- Wow! signal – 1977 radio signal detected as part of SETI
- Project CETI – Initiative for understanding the communication of sperm whales
