= Voice search =

Internet search using a voice command

Voice search, also called voice-enabled search, allows the user to use a voice to search the Internet, a website, or an app. In a broader definition, voice search includes open-domain keyword query on any information on the Internet, for example in Google Voice Search, Cortana, Siri and Amazon Echo. Voice search is often interactive, involving several rounds of interaction that allows a system to ask for clarification. Voice search is a type of dialog system. Voice search is not a replacement for typed search. Rather the search terms, experience and use cases can differ heavily depending on the input type.

== Supported language ==
Language is the most essential factor for a system to understand, and provide the most accurate results of what the user searches. This covers across languages, dialects, and accents, as users want a voice assistant that both understands them and speaks to them understandably.

While spoken and written languages differ, voice search should support natural spoken language instead of only transforming voice into text and doing a regular text search with the help speech recognition.

For example, in typed search an eCommerce user can easily copy and paste an alphanumeric product code to search field, but when speaking the search terms can be very different, such as "show me the new Bluetooth headphones by Samsung".

== How it works ==
The difference between text and voice search is not only the input type. The mechanism must include an automatic speech recognition (ASR) for input, but it can also include natural language understanding for natural spoken search queries such as "What's the population for the United States"

It can include text-to-speech (TTS) or a regular display for output modalities. Users might sometimes be required to activate the search by using a wake word.

Then, the search system will detect the language spoken by the user. It will then detect the keywords and context of the sentence. Lastly, the device will return results depending on its output. A device with a screen might display the results, while a device without a screen will speak them back to the searcher.

== See also ==
- SpeechWeb
- Query by humming
