= Microsoft Query =

Method of creating database queries

Microsoft Query is a visual method of creating database queries using examples based on a text string, the name of a document or a list of documents. The QBE system converts the user input into a formal database query using Structured Query Language (SQL) on the backend, allowing the user to perform powerful searches without having to explicitly compose them in SQL, and without even needing to know SQL. It is derived from Moshé M. Zloof's original Query by Example (QBE) implemented in the mid-1970s at IBM's Research Centre in Yorktown, New York.

In the context of Microsoft Access, QBE is used for introducing students to database querying, and as a user-friendly database management system for small businesses.

Microsoft Excel allows results of QBE queries to be embedded in spreadsheets.

== See also ==
- Query by Example
- Microsoft Access
- Microsoft SQL Server
- Power Query
