= Public Media Infrastructure =

American non-profit corporation

Public Media Infrastructure (PMI) is an American non-profit corporation created to help local public media radio stations with distribution. The corporation was founded by Public Radio Exchange, American Public Media Group, New York Public Radio, the Station Resource Group, and the National Federation of Community Broadcasters.

== History ==
PMI was founded in 2025 to provide services to local public media radio stations with technical infrastructure – distribution across platforms, analytics, and sponsorship. It was established with a grant of up to $57.9 million dollars over five years from the Corporation for Public Broadcasting. PMI was established shortly following the announcement that the CPB would be closing. Following the end of federal funding, CPB ceased operations in January 2026. National Public Radio filed a lawsuit against CPB alleging that they unlawfully yielded to political pressure by the Trump administration and withheld federal funds intended for NPR for interconnection purposes. The lawsuit was latter settled.
