= Project Phoenix (SETI) =

SETI project

Project Phoenix was a SETI project to search for extraterrestrial intelligence by analyzing patterns in radio signals. It was run by the independently funded SETI Institute of Mountain View, California, U.S.

Project Phoenix started work in February 1995 with the Parkes radio telescope located in New South Wales, Australia, the largest telescope in the Southern Hemisphere.

Between September 1996 and April 1998, the Project used the National Radio Astronomy Observatory, Green Bank in Green Bank, West Virginia, U.S.

Rather than attempting to scan the whole sky for messages, the Project concentrated on nearby systems that are similar to our own. Project Phoenix's targets comprised about 800 stars with a 200 light-year range.

The Project searched for radio signals as narrow as 1 Hz between 1,000 and 3,000 MHz: a broad bandwidth compared with most SETI searches.

In March 2004 the Project announced that after checking the 800 stars on its list, it had failed to find any evidence of extraterrestrial signals. Project leader Peter Backus remarked that they had been forced to conclude that "we live in a quiet neighborhood".

== See also ==
- HabCat
