= Query by Example =

Database query language

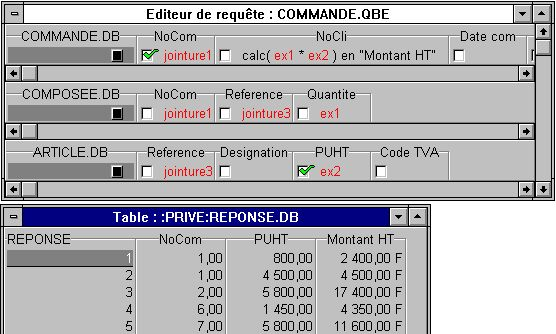
Example of QBE query with joins, designed in Borland's Paradox database

Query by Example (QBE) is a database query language for relational databases.

== History ==
Query by Example was devised by Moshé M. Zloof at IBM Research during the mid-1970s, in parallel to the development of SQL, and influenced by the work of Edgar Codd. It is the first graphical query language, using visual tables where the user would enter commands, example elements and conditions. Many graphical front-ends for databases use the ideas from QBE today. Originally limited only for the purpose of retrieving data, QBE was later extended to allow other operations, such as inserts, deletes and updates, as well as creation of temporary tables.

The motivation behind QBE is that a parser can convert the user's actions into statements expressed in a database manipulation language, such as SQL. Behind the scenes, it is this statement that is actually executed. A suitably comprehensive front-end can reduce the need for users to remember the finer details of SQL, and selecting tables and columns from a list can be quicker than typing their names.

In the context of information retrieval, QBE has a somewhat different meaning. The user can submit a document, or several documents, and ask for "similar" documents to be retrieved from a document database [see search by multiple examples]. Similarity search is based comparing document vectors (see Vector Space Model).

QBE represents seminal work in end-user development, frequently cited in research papers as an early example of this topic.

Currently, QBE is supported in several relational database front ends, notably Microsoft Access, which implements "Visual Query by Example", as well as Microsoft SQL Server Enterprise Manager. It is also implemented in several object-oriented databases (e.g. in db4o).

QBE is based on the logical formalism called tableau query, although QBE adds some extensions to that, much like SQL is based on the relational algebra.

== Example ==
An example using the Suppliers and Parts database is given here to illustrate how QBE works.

Simple QBE example
S	S#	SNAME	OWNER	SCITY
	P.SX		J. DOE	ROME

== As a general technique ==
The term also refers to a general technique influenced by Zloof's work whereby only items with search values are used to "filter" the results. It provides a way for a software user to perform queries without having to know a query language (such as SQL). The software can automatically generate the queries for the user (usually behind the scenes). Here are two examples based on a Contacts table with the following text (character) columns: Name, Address, City, State, and Zipcode:

Contacts Query Form - Example A:
.....Name: Bob
..Address:
.....City:
....State: TX
..Zipcode:

Resulting SQL:

SELECT * FROM Contacts WHERE Name='Bob' AND State='TX';

Note how blank items do not generate SQL terms. Since "Address" is blank, there is no clause generated for it.

Contacts Query Form - Example B:
.....Name: 
..Address:
.....City: Sampleton
....State: 
..Zipcode: 12345

Resulting SQL:

SELECT * FROM Contacts WHERE City='Sampleton' AND Zipcode='12345';

More advanced versions of QBE have other comparison operator options, often via a pull-down menu, such as "Contains", "Not Contains", "Starts With", "Greater-Than", and so forth.

Another approach to text comparisons is to allow one or more wildcard character characters. For example, if an asterisk is designated as a wildcard character in a particular system, then searching for last names using "Rob*" would return (match) last names such as "Rob", "Robert", "Robertson", "Roberto", etc.

Contacts Query Form - Example C:
.....Name: Rob*
..Address:
.....City: 
....State: 
..Zipcode:

Resulting SQL:

SELECT * FROM Contacts WHERE Name LIKE 'Rob%'

In standard SQL, the percent sign functions like a wildcard in a LIKE clause. In this case, the query-by-examplme form processing software would translate the asterisk to a percent sign. (An asterisk is a more common wildcard convention outside of SQL, so here the form is attempting to be more user friendly.)

WARNING: Query-by-example software should be careful to avoid SQL injection. Otherwise, devious users may penetrate further into the database than intended by builders of the query forms.

== See also ==
- CRUD
- Microsoft Query by Example
- GraphQL a QBE for JSON front-ends.
- QBIC

== Sources ==
- Zloof, Moshé M. (May 1975), "Query by Example", National Computer Conference, AFIPS Conference Proceedings, vol. 44, Anaheim, California: AFIPS Press, pp. 431–8, ISSN 0095-6880.
- Ramakrishnan, Raghu; Gehrke, Johannes, "6. QBE" (PDF), Database Management Systems (3rd ed.), Wisc.
- Date, Christopher ‘Chris’ J. (2004), "8. Relational Calculus", An Introduction to Database Systems, Addison-Wesley Pearson, pp. 242–7, ISBN 978-0-321-18956-1.
- Oracle Definitions, Tech target, archived from the original on 2006-06-14.
- Zaiane, O. (1998), "5. Query-by-Example (QBE)", CC 354 notes, Canada: SFI.
